

450001–450100 

|-bgcolor=#fefefe
| 450001 ||  || — || September 8, 1996 || Kitt Peak || Spacewatch || — || align=right data-sort-value="0.96" | 960 m || 
|-id=002 bgcolor=#d6d6d6
| 450002 ||  || — || November 11, 2006 || Kitt Peak || Spacewatch || — || align=right | 2.3 km || 
|-id=003 bgcolor=#FA8072
| 450003 ||  || — || October 3, 2006 || Mount Lemmon || Mount Lemmon Survey || — || align=right data-sort-value="0.32" | 320 m || 
|-id=004 bgcolor=#fefefe
| 450004 ||  || — || August 9, 2004 || Socorro || LINEAR || V || align=right data-sort-value="0.77" | 770 m || 
|-id=005 bgcolor=#E9E9E9
| 450005 ||  || — || February 24, 2006 || Kitt Peak || Spacewatch || — || align=right | 2.0 km || 
|-id=006 bgcolor=#d6d6d6
| 450006 ||  || — || January 6, 2006 || Catalina || CSS || — || align=right | 4.5 km || 
|-id=007 bgcolor=#fefefe
| 450007 ||  || — || January 25, 2006 || Kitt Peak || Spacewatch || — || align=right data-sort-value="0.91" | 910 m || 
|-id=008 bgcolor=#fefefe
| 450008 ||  || — || August 8, 2004 || Socorro || LINEAR || — || align=right data-sort-value="0.81" | 810 m || 
|-id=009 bgcolor=#E9E9E9
| 450009 ||  || — || September 14, 2007 || Mount Lemmon || Mount Lemmon Survey || EUN || align=right | 1.0 km || 
|-id=010 bgcolor=#fefefe
| 450010 ||  || — || December 29, 2008 || Kitt Peak || Spacewatch || — || align=right data-sort-value="0.82" | 820 m || 
|-id=011 bgcolor=#E9E9E9
| 450011 ||  || — || October 28, 2011 || Catalina || CSS || — || align=right | 1.6 km || 
|-id=012 bgcolor=#d6d6d6
| 450012 ||  || — || July 11, 2005 || Kitt Peak || Spacewatch || — || align=right | 3.4 km || 
|-id=013 bgcolor=#d6d6d6
| 450013 ||  || — || March 13, 2008 || Kitt Peak || Spacewatch || — || align=right | 3.4 km || 
|-id=014 bgcolor=#fefefe
| 450014 ||  || — || September 13, 2004 || Anderson Mesa || LONEOS || — || align=right data-sort-value="0.75" | 750 m || 
|-id=015 bgcolor=#fefefe
| 450015 ||  || — || October 26, 2005 || Kitt Peak || Spacewatch || V || align=right data-sort-value="0.62" | 620 m || 
|-id=016 bgcolor=#fefefe
| 450016 ||  || — || February 16, 2010 || Kitt Peak || Spacewatch || — || align=right | 1.0 km || 
|-id=017 bgcolor=#d6d6d6
| 450017 ||  || — || June 19, 2009 || Kitt Peak || Spacewatch || — || align=right | 4.6 km || 
|-id=018 bgcolor=#fefefe
| 450018 ||  || — || October 12, 1977 || Palomar || PLS || — || align=right data-sort-value="0.94" | 940 m || 
|-id=019 bgcolor=#fefefe
| 450019 || 2015 QN || — || January 29, 2010 || WISE || WISE || — || align=right | 2.4 km || 
|-id=020 bgcolor=#d6d6d6
| 450020 ||  || — || September 10, 2004 || Socorro || LINEAR || — || align=right | 3.8 km || 
|-id=021 bgcolor=#d6d6d6
| 450021 ||  || — || June 13, 2010 || WISE || WISE || — || align=right | 2.7 km || 
|-id=022 bgcolor=#fefefe
| 450022 ||  || — || October 29, 2005 || Catalina || CSS || — || align=right data-sort-value="0.78" | 780 m || 
|-id=023 bgcolor=#fefefe
| 450023 ||  || — || October 14, 2004 || Kitt Peak || Spacewatch || — || align=right data-sort-value="0.80" | 800 m || 
|-id=024 bgcolor=#fefefe
| 450024 ||  || — || December 5, 2005 || Kitt Peak || Spacewatch || — || align=right data-sort-value="0.84" | 840 m || 
|-id=025 bgcolor=#fefefe
| 450025 ||  || — || September 27, 2008 || Mount Lemmon || Mount Lemmon Survey || — || align=right data-sort-value="0.75" | 750 m || 
|-id=026 bgcolor=#fefefe
| 450026 ||  || — || October 2, 1995 || Kitt Peak || Spacewatch || — || align=right data-sort-value="0.62" | 620 m || 
|-id=027 bgcolor=#d6d6d6
| 450027 ||  || — || September 9, 2004 || Kitt Peak || Spacewatch || — || align=right | 3.1 km || 
|-id=028 bgcolor=#d6d6d6
| 450028 ||  || — || September 23, 2000 || Socorro || LINEAR || — || align=right | 2.0 km || 
|-id=029 bgcolor=#FA8072
| 450029 ||  || — || August 6, 2004 || Campo Imperatore || CINEOS || — || align=right data-sort-value="0.71" | 710 m || 
|-id=030 bgcolor=#d6d6d6
| 450030 ||  || — || October 9, 2010 || Mount Lemmon || Mount Lemmon Survey || EOS || align=right | 1.7 km || 
|-id=031 bgcolor=#E9E9E9
| 450031 ||  || — || October 14, 2007 || Kitt Peak || Spacewatch || — || align=right | 1.1 km || 
|-id=032 bgcolor=#d6d6d6
| 450032 ||  || — || October 4, 2004 || Kitt Peak || Spacewatch || THM || align=right | 2.2 km || 
|-id=033 bgcolor=#d6d6d6
| 450033 ||  || — || December 30, 2005 || Catalina || CSS || — || align=right | 4.3 km || 
|-id=034 bgcolor=#d6d6d6
| 450034 ||  || — || February 21, 2007 || Kitt Peak || Spacewatch || — || align=right | 3.5 km || 
|-id=035 bgcolor=#E9E9E9
| 450035 ||  || — || October 30, 2011 || Kitt Peak || Spacewatch || EUN || align=right | 1.1 km || 
|-id=036 bgcolor=#d6d6d6
| 450036 ||  || — || November 28, 2005 || Kitt Peak || Spacewatch || — || align=right | 3.7 km || 
|-id=037 bgcolor=#E9E9E9
| 450037 ||  || — || December 29, 2008 || Mount Lemmon || Mount Lemmon Survey || — || align=right | 2.3 km || 
|-id=038 bgcolor=#E9E9E9
| 450038 ||  || — || March 8, 2005 || Kitt Peak || Spacewatch || EUN || align=right | 1.2 km || 
|-id=039 bgcolor=#E9E9E9
| 450039 ||  || — || August 19, 2006 || Kitt Peak || Spacewatch || EUN || align=right | 1.2 km || 
|-id=040 bgcolor=#d6d6d6
| 450040 ||  || — || October 13, 2010 || Mount Lemmon || Mount Lemmon Survey || — || align=right | 2.4 km || 
|-id=041 bgcolor=#fefefe
| 450041 ||  || — || April 11, 2007 || Kitt Peak || Spacewatch || NYS || align=right data-sort-value="0.77" | 770 m || 
|-id=042 bgcolor=#E9E9E9
| 450042 ||  || — || September 28, 2011 || Mount Lemmon || Mount Lemmon Survey || — || align=right | 1.3 km || 
|-id=043 bgcolor=#d6d6d6
| 450043 ||  || — || March 26, 2008 || Mount Lemmon || Mount Lemmon Survey || EOS || align=right | 1.6 km || 
|-id=044 bgcolor=#d6d6d6
| 450044 ||  || — || October 1, 2010 || Catalina || CSS || — || align=right | 3.4 km || 
|-id=045 bgcolor=#E9E9E9
| 450045 ||  || — || September 25, 2007 || Mount Lemmon || Mount Lemmon Survey || RAF || align=right data-sort-value="0.68" | 680 m || 
|-id=046 bgcolor=#d6d6d6
| 450046 ||  || — || December 1, 2005 || Kitt Peak || Spacewatch || EOS || align=right | 2.2 km || 
|-id=047 bgcolor=#d6d6d6
| 450047 ||  || — || August 1, 2010 || WISE || WISE || — || align=right | 4.2 km || 
|-id=048 bgcolor=#d6d6d6
| 450048 ||  || — || September 13, 2004 || Socorro || LINEAR || — || align=right | 3.3 km || 
|-id=049 bgcolor=#fefefe
| 450049 ||  || — || August 1, 1997 || Caussols || ODAS || — || align=right data-sort-value="0.69" | 690 m || 
|-id=050 bgcolor=#E9E9E9
| 450050 ||  || — || October 15, 1998 || Kitt Peak || Spacewatch || EUN || align=right | 1.1 km || 
|-id=051 bgcolor=#fefefe
| 450051 ||  || — || May 13, 2005 || Mount Lemmon || Mount Lemmon Survey || — || align=right data-sort-value="0.73" | 730 m || 
|-id=052 bgcolor=#fefefe
| 450052 ||  || — || October 6, 2000 || Anderson Mesa || LONEOS || — || align=right data-sort-value="0.75" | 750 m || 
|-id=053 bgcolor=#E9E9E9
| 450053 ||  || — || October 16, 2007 || Catalina || CSS || — || align=right | 1.1 km || 
|-id=054 bgcolor=#E9E9E9
| 450054 ||  || — || September 18, 2006 || Kitt Peak || Spacewatch || EUN || align=right | 1.2 km || 
|-id=055 bgcolor=#fefefe
| 450055 ||  || — || January 28, 2007 || Kitt Peak || Spacewatch || — || align=right data-sort-value="0.91" | 910 m || 
|-id=056 bgcolor=#E9E9E9
| 450056 ||  || — || September 25, 2007 || Mount Lemmon || Mount Lemmon Survey || — || align=right | 1.3 km || 
|-id=057 bgcolor=#fefefe
| 450057 ||  || — || February 21, 2007 || Mount Lemmon || Mount Lemmon Survey || — || align=right data-sort-value="0.82" | 820 m || 
|-id=058 bgcolor=#E9E9E9
| 450058 ||  || — || March 15, 2004 || Kitt Peak || Spacewatch || — || align=right | 1.7 km || 
|-id=059 bgcolor=#E9E9E9
| 450059 ||  || — || March 10, 2005 || Mount Lemmon || Mount Lemmon Survey || — || align=right | 2.0 km || 
|-id=060 bgcolor=#E9E9E9
| 450060 ||  || — || April 12, 2005 || Mount Lemmon || Mount Lemmon Survey || — || align=right | 1.4 km || 
|-id=061 bgcolor=#E9E9E9
| 450061 ||  || — || June 11, 2010 || Mount Lemmon || Mount Lemmon Survey || — || align=right | 1.3 km || 
|-id=062 bgcolor=#fefefe
| 450062 ||  || — || September 5, 2005 || Catalina || CSS || — || align=right data-sort-value="0.64" | 640 m || 
|-id=063 bgcolor=#E9E9E9
| 450063 ||  || — || March 17, 2005 || Mount Lemmon || Mount Lemmon Survey || — || align=right | 1.5 km || 
|-id=064 bgcolor=#fefefe
| 450064 ||  || — || January 27, 2003 || Socorro || LINEAR || — || align=right | 1.6 km || 
|-id=065 bgcolor=#d6d6d6
| 450065 ||  || — || April 3, 2008 || Mount Lemmon || Mount Lemmon Survey || — || align=right | 2.2 km || 
|-id=066 bgcolor=#E9E9E9
| 450066 ||  || — || November 1, 2007 || Mount Lemmon || Mount Lemmon Survey || — || align=right data-sort-value="0.87" | 870 m || 
|-id=067 bgcolor=#E9E9E9
| 450067 ||  || — || October 20, 2006 || Kitt Peak || Spacewatch || HOF || align=right | 2.2 km || 
|-id=068 bgcolor=#fefefe
| 450068 ||  || — || February 2, 2006 || Kitt Peak || Spacewatch || — || align=right data-sort-value="0.90" | 900 m || 
|-id=069 bgcolor=#E9E9E9
| 450069 ||  || — || September 18, 1998 || Kitt Peak || Spacewatch || — || align=right | 1.6 km || 
|-id=070 bgcolor=#fefefe
| 450070 ||  || — || August 7, 2008 || Kitt Peak || Spacewatch || — || align=right data-sort-value="0.75" | 750 m || 
|-id=071 bgcolor=#E9E9E9
| 450071 ||  || — || October 6, 2007 || Kitt Peak || Spacewatch || — || align=right | 1.0 km || 
|-id=072 bgcolor=#fefefe
| 450072 ||  || — || September 5, 2008 || Kitt Peak || Spacewatch || — || align=right data-sort-value="0.78" | 780 m || 
|-id=073 bgcolor=#E9E9E9
| 450073 ||  || — || August 28, 2006 || Kitt Peak || Spacewatch || — || align=right | 2.1 km || 
|-id=074 bgcolor=#fefefe
| 450074 ||  || — || March 14, 2007 || Mount Lemmon || Mount Lemmon Survey || NYS || align=right data-sort-value="0.55" | 550 m || 
|-id=075 bgcolor=#fefefe
| 450075 ||  || — || August 8, 2004 || Socorro || LINEAR || — || align=right data-sort-value="0.95" | 950 m || 
|-id=076 bgcolor=#d6d6d6
| 450076 ||  || — || September 4, 2010 || Mount Lemmon || Mount Lemmon Survey || — || align=right | 2.0 km || 
|-id=077 bgcolor=#E9E9E9
| 450077 ||  || — || October 8, 2007 || Mount Lemmon || Mount Lemmon Survey || — || align=right data-sort-value="0.81" | 810 m || 
|-id=078 bgcolor=#fefefe
| 450078 ||  || — || September 11, 2007 || Mount Lemmon || Mount Lemmon Survey || — || align=right data-sort-value="0.84" | 840 m || 
|-id=079 bgcolor=#fefefe
| 450079 ||  || — || March 3, 2006 || Kitt Peak || Spacewatch || — || align=right data-sort-value="0.59" | 590 m || 
|-id=080 bgcolor=#d6d6d6
| 450080 ||  || — || February 1, 2008 || Kitt Peak || Spacewatch || — || align=right | 3.0 km || 
|-id=081 bgcolor=#fefefe
| 450081 ||  || — || October 11, 2004 || Kitt Peak || Spacewatch || NYS || align=right data-sort-value="0.76" | 760 m || 
|-id=082 bgcolor=#fefefe
| 450082 ||  || — || February 23, 2007 || Kitt Peak || Spacewatch || — || align=right data-sort-value="0.84" | 840 m || 
|-id=083 bgcolor=#d6d6d6
| 450083 ||  || — || October 10, 2004 || Kitt Peak || Spacewatch || — || align=right | 3.2 km || 
|-id=084 bgcolor=#E9E9E9
| 450084 ||  || — || September 16, 2006 || Catalina || CSS || — || align=right | 2.8 km || 
|-id=085 bgcolor=#E9E9E9
| 450085 ||  || — || September 25, 2006 || Catalina || CSS || — || align=right | 2.4 km || 
|-id=086 bgcolor=#fefefe
| 450086 ||  || — || December 21, 2006 || Mount Lemmon || Mount Lemmon Survey || — || align=right data-sort-value="0.94" | 940 m || 
|-id=087 bgcolor=#d6d6d6
| 450087 ||  || — || February 20, 2002 || Kitt Peak || Spacewatch || LIX || align=right | 4.4 km || 
|-id=088 bgcolor=#d6d6d6
| 450088 ||  || — || November 5, 2005 || Catalina || CSS || — || align=right | 3.2 km || 
|-id=089 bgcolor=#d6d6d6
| 450089 ||  || — || February 21, 2007 || Mount Lemmon || Mount Lemmon Survey || VER || align=right | 3.9 km || 
|-id=090 bgcolor=#d6d6d6
| 450090 ||  || — || November 9, 1999 || Kitt Peak || Spacewatch || (8737) || align=right | 2.6 km || 
|-id=091 bgcolor=#d6d6d6
| 450091 ||  || — || April 13, 2004 || Kitt Peak || Spacewatch || — || align=right | 1.8 km || 
|-id=092 bgcolor=#fefefe
| 450092 ||  || — || October 25, 2005 || Kitt Peak || Spacewatch || — || align=right data-sort-value="0.82" | 820 m || 
|-id=093 bgcolor=#fefefe
| 450093 ||  || — || November 19, 2008 || Mount Lemmon || Mount Lemmon Survey || — || align=right data-sort-value="0.81" | 810 m || 
|-id=094 bgcolor=#E9E9E9
| 450094 ||  || — || January 18, 2008 || Kitt Peak || Spacewatch || (1547) || align=right | 1.1 km || 
|-id=095 bgcolor=#d6d6d6
| 450095 ||  || — || January 27, 2007 || Mount Lemmon || Mount Lemmon Survey || — || align=right | 3.9 km || 
|-id=096 bgcolor=#FA8072
| 450096 ||  || — || September 19, 1995 || Kitt Peak || Spacewatch || — || align=right data-sort-value="0.62" | 620 m || 
|-id=097 bgcolor=#d6d6d6
| 450097 ||  || — || February 28, 2008 || Mount Lemmon || Mount Lemmon Survey || — || align=right | 3.0 km || 
|-id=098 bgcolor=#d6d6d6
| 450098 ||  || — || March 4, 2008 || Mount Lemmon || Mount Lemmon Survey || — || align=right | 2.8 km || 
|-id=099 bgcolor=#fefefe
| 450099 ||  || — || November 16, 2009 || Mount Lemmon || Mount Lemmon Survey || — || align=right data-sort-value="0.63" | 630 m || 
|-id=100 bgcolor=#E9E9E9
| 450100 ||  || — || October 23, 2011 || Kitt Peak || Spacewatch || — || align=right | 2.4 km || 
|}

450101–450200 

|-bgcolor=#fefefe
| 450101 ||  || — || September 26, 2000 || Anderson Mesa || LONEOS || — || align=right data-sort-value="0.96" | 960 m || 
|-id=102 bgcolor=#d6d6d6
| 450102 ||  || — || October 7, 2004 || Anderson Mesa || LONEOS || THM || align=right | 2.6 km || 
|-id=103 bgcolor=#E9E9E9
| 450103 ||  || — || September 18, 2006 || Catalina || CSS || — || align=right | 2.0 km || 
|-id=104 bgcolor=#E9E9E9
| 450104 ||  || — || August 29, 2006 || Catalina || CSS || — || align=right | 2.1 km || 
|-id=105 bgcolor=#d6d6d6
| 450105 ||  || — || July 3, 2005 || Mount Lemmon || Mount Lemmon Survey || 615 || align=right | 1.6 km || 
|-id=106 bgcolor=#fefefe
| 450106 ||  || — || April 15, 2007 || Kitt Peak || Spacewatch || — || align=right data-sort-value="0.82" | 820 m || 
|-id=107 bgcolor=#fefefe
| 450107 ||  || — || October 28, 2005 || Kitt Peak || Spacewatch || — || align=right data-sort-value="0.57" | 570 m || 
|-id=108 bgcolor=#d6d6d6
| 450108 ||  || — || December 28, 2005 || Kitt Peak || Spacewatch || — || align=right | 1.9 km || 
|-id=109 bgcolor=#d6d6d6
| 450109 ||  || — || August 31, 2005 || Kitt Peak || Spacewatch || — || align=right | 1.9 km || 
|-id=110 bgcolor=#d6d6d6
| 450110 ||  || — || March 9, 2007 || Kitt Peak || Spacewatch || EOS || align=right | 1.9 km || 
|-id=111 bgcolor=#fefefe
| 450111 ||  || — || January 31, 2009 || Kitt Peak || Spacewatch || — || align=right data-sort-value="0.75" | 750 m || 
|-id=112 bgcolor=#fefefe
| 450112 ||  || — || September 11, 2007 || Mount Lemmon || Mount Lemmon Survey || — || align=right data-sort-value="0.78" | 780 m || 
|-id=113 bgcolor=#d6d6d6
| 450113 ||  || — || October 1, 2005 || Catalina || CSS || — || align=right | 3.1 km || 
|-id=114 bgcolor=#fefefe
| 450114 ||  || — || June 22, 2007 || Kitt Peak || Spacewatch || NYS || align=right data-sort-value="0.66" | 660 m || 
|-id=115 bgcolor=#fefefe
| 450115 ||  || — || December 4, 2008 || Mount Lemmon || Mount Lemmon Survey || NYS || align=right data-sort-value="0.69" | 690 m || 
|-id=116 bgcolor=#E9E9E9
| 450116 ||  || — || November 26, 2011 || Mount Lemmon || Mount Lemmon Survey || — || align=right | 1.6 km || 
|-id=117 bgcolor=#d6d6d6
| 450117 ||  || — || April 8, 2002 || Kitt Peak || Spacewatch || — || align=right | 3.6 km || 
|-id=118 bgcolor=#E9E9E9
| 450118 ||  || — || August 29, 2006 || Kitt Peak || Spacewatch || — || align=right | 1.8 km || 
|-id=119 bgcolor=#d6d6d6
| 450119 ||  || — || January 27, 2007 || Kitt Peak || Spacewatch || — || align=right | 3.0 km || 
|-id=120 bgcolor=#E9E9E9
| 450120 ||  || — || October 16, 2006 || Catalina || CSS || — || align=right | 2.0 km || 
|-id=121 bgcolor=#fefefe
| 450121 ||  || — || October 9, 2008 || Kitt Peak || Spacewatch || — || align=right data-sort-value="0.70" | 700 m || 
|-id=122 bgcolor=#d6d6d6
| 450122 ||  || — || September 15, 2010 || Kitt Peak || Spacewatch || — || align=right | 2.9 km || 
|-id=123 bgcolor=#fefefe
| 450123 ||  || — || September 3, 2008 || Kitt Peak || Spacewatch || — || align=right data-sort-value="0.94" | 940 m || 
|-id=124 bgcolor=#d6d6d6
| 450124 ||  || — || January 7, 2006 || Mount Lemmon || Mount Lemmon Survey || — || align=right | 2.9 km || 
|-id=125 bgcolor=#d6d6d6
| 450125 ||  || — || June 24, 2009 || Kitt Peak || Spacewatch || LIX || align=right | 3.5 km || 
|-id=126 bgcolor=#E9E9E9
| 450126 ||  || — || May 11, 2010 || Mount Lemmon || Mount Lemmon Survey || — || align=right | 1.2 km || 
|-id=127 bgcolor=#d6d6d6
| 450127 ||  || — || February 1, 2001 || Kitt Peak || Spacewatch || — || align=right | 3.5 km || 
|-id=128 bgcolor=#E9E9E9
| 450128 ||  || — || September 19, 2003 || Kitt Peak || Spacewatch || — || align=right | 2.5 km || 
|-id=129 bgcolor=#E9E9E9
| 450129 ||  || — || December 6, 2008 || Kitt Peak || Spacewatch || — || align=right | 3.9 km || 
|-id=130 bgcolor=#E9E9E9
| 450130 ||  || — || May 23, 2006 || Siding Spring || SSS || — || align=right | 1.7 km || 
|-id=131 bgcolor=#d6d6d6
| 450131 ||  || — || March 8, 2008 || Kitt Peak || Spacewatch || — || align=right | 3.5 km || 
|-id=132 bgcolor=#fefefe
| 450132 ||  || — || October 10, 2005 || Catalina || CSS || — || align=right data-sort-value="0.78" | 780 m || 
|-id=133 bgcolor=#E9E9E9
| 450133 ||  || — || August 29, 2006 || Kitt Peak || Spacewatch || — || align=right | 1.8 km || 
|-id=134 bgcolor=#E9E9E9
| 450134 ||  || — || November 26, 1994 || Kitt Peak || Spacewatch || (5) || align=right data-sort-value="0.89" | 890 m || 
|-id=135 bgcolor=#d6d6d6
| 450135 ||  || — || September 19, 1995 || Kitt Peak || Spacewatch || BRA || align=right | 2.2 km || 
|-id=136 bgcolor=#d6d6d6
| 450136 ||  || — || September 22, 1995 || Kitt Peak || Spacewatch || — || align=right | 1.8 km || 
|-id=137 bgcolor=#fefefe
| 450137 ||  || — || January 12, 1996 || Kitt Peak || Spacewatch || V || align=right data-sort-value="0.62" | 620 m || 
|-id=138 bgcolor=#FA8072
| 450138 ||  || — || January 28, 1998 || Haleakala || NEAT || — || align=right | 1.0 km || 
|-id=139 bgcolor=#E9E9E9
| 450139 ||  || — || September 26, 1998 || Socorro || LINEAR || (5) || align=right | 1.0 km || 
|-id=140 bgcolor=#E9E9E9
| 450140 ||  || — || October 15, 1998 || Kitt Peak || Spacewatch || — || align=right | 1.2 km || 
|-id=141 bgcolor=#E9E9E9
| 450141 ||  || — || October 20, 1998 || Kitt Peak || Spacewatch || — || align=right | 1.2 km || 
|-id=142 bgcolor=#FFC2E0
| 450142 ||  || — || December 9, 1998 || Socorro || LINEAR || APOPHA || align=right data-sort-value="0.39" | 390 m || 
|-id=143 bgcolor=#FFC2E0
| 450143 ||  || — || March 13, 1999 || Kitt Peak || Spacewatch || APOcritical || align=right data-sort-value="0.43" | 430 m || 
|-id=144 bgcolor=#d6d6d6
| 450144 ||  || — || September 8, 1999 || Socorro || LINEAR || — || align=right | 4.3 km || 
|-id=145 bgcolor=#d6d6d6
| 450145 ||  || — || September 9, 1999 || Socorro || LINEAR || — || align=right | 2.9 km || 
|-id=146 bgcolor=#E9E9E9
| 450146 ||  || — || October 9, 1999 || Kitt Peak || Spacewatch || — || align=right data-sort-value="0.84" | 840 m || 
|-id=147 bgcolor=#d6d6d6
| 450147 ||  || — || October 13, 1999 || Kitt Peak || Spacewatch || — || align=right | 2.2 km || 
|-id=148 bgcolor=#d6d6d6
| 450148 ||  || — || October 10, 1999 || Socorro || LINEAR || — || align=right | 2.4 km || 
|-id=149 bgcolor=#d6d6d6
| 450149 ||  || — || November 9, 1999 || Socorro || LINEAR || — || align=right | 2.6 km || 
|-id=150 bgcolor=#d6d6d6
| 450150 ||  || — || October 18, 1999 || Kitt Peak || Spacewatch || — || align=right | 2.2 km || 
|-id=151 bgcolor=#d6d6d6
| 450151 ||  || — || October 11, 1999 || Socorro || LINEAR || — || align=right | 2.5 km || 
|-id=152 bgcolor=#E9E9E9
| 450152 ||  || — || November 12, 1999 || Socorro || LINEAR || — || align=right data-sort-value="0.98" | 980 m || 
|-id=153 bgcolor=#E9E9E9
| 450153 ||  || — || January 6, 2000 || Prescott || P. G. Comba || — || align=right | 1.3 km || 
|-id=154 bgcolor=#FA8072
| 450154 ||  || — || January 5, 2000 || Socorro || LINEAR || — || align=right data-sort-value="0.77" | 770 m || 
|-id=155 bgcolor=#d6d6d6
| 450155 ||  || — || January 5, 2000 || Socorro || LINEAR || — || align=right | 3.9 km || 
|-id=156 bgcolor=#E9E9E9
| 450156 ||  || — || December 18, 1999 || Kitt Peak || Spacewatch || (5) || align=right data-sort-value="0.90" | 900 m || 
|-id=157 bgcolor=#E9E9E9
| 450157 ||  || — || February 29, 2000 || Socorro || LINEAR || — || align=right data-sort-value="0.86" | 860 m || 
|-id=158 bgcolor=#FA8072
| 450158 ||  || — || February 29, 2000 || Socorro || LINEAR || — || align=right | 2.0 km || 
|-id=159 bgcolor=#FFC2E0
| 450159 ||  || — || May 3, 2000 || Socorro || LINEAR || APOcritical || align=right data-sort-value="0.74" | 740 m || 
|-id=160 bgcolor=#FFC2E0
| 450160 ||  || — || September 1, 2000 || Socorro || LINEAR || APO +1km || align=right | 1.6 km || 
|-id=161 bgcolor=#FA8072
| 450161 ||  || — || December 22, 2000 || Anderson Mesa || LONEOS || unusual || align=right | 2.3 km || 
|-id=162 bgcolor=#E9E9E9
| 450162 ||  || — || May 24, 2001 || Socorro || LINEAR || — || align=right | 1.5 km || 
|-id=163 bgcolor=#fefefe
| 450163 ||  || — || June 28, 2001 || Anderson Mesa || LONEOS || — || align=right data-sort-value="0.83" | 830 m || 
|-id=164 bgcolor=#fefefe
| 450164 ||  || — || July 17, 2001 || Anderson Mesa || LONEOS || — || align=right data-sort-value="0.98" | 980 m || 
|-id=165 bgcolor=#E9E9E9
| 450165 ||  || — || August 22, 2001 || Socorro || LINEAR || — || align=right | 2.4 km || 
|-id=166 bgcolor=#E9E9E9
| 450166 ||  || — || September 12, 2001 || Socorro || LINEAR || — || align=right | 2.6 km || 
|-id=167 bgcolor=#E9E9E9
| 450167 ||  || — || September 11, 2001 || Anderson Mesa || LONEOS || — || align=right | 2.3 km || 
|-id=168 bgcolor=#E9E9E9
| 450168 ||  || — || September 16, 2001 || Socorro || LINEAR || — || align=right | 2.3 km || 
|-id=169 bgcolor=#E9E9E9
| 450169 ||  || — || September 19, 2001 || Socorro || LINEAR || AEO || align=right | 1.1 km || 
|-id=170 bgcolor=#fefefe
| 450170 ||  || — || September 19, 2001 || Socorro || LINEAR || — || align=right data-sort-value="0.47" | 470 m || 
|-id=171 bgcolor=#E9E9E9
| 450171 ||  || — || September 19, 2001 || Socorro || LINEAR ||  || align=right | 2.5 km || 
|-id=172 bgcolor=#E9E9E9
| 450172 ||  || — || September 19, 2001 || Socorro || LINEAR || — || align=right | 2.0 km || 
|-id=173 bgcolor=#E9E9E9
| 450173 ||  || — || October 13, 2001 || Socorro || LINEAR || — || align=right | 1.3 km || 
|-id=174 bgcolor=#fefefe
| 450174 ||  || — || October 15, 2001 || Nashville || R. Clingan || — || align=right data-sort-value="0.82" | 820 m || 
|-id=175 bgcolor=#fefefe
| 450175 ||  || — || October 14, 2001 || Socorro || LINEAR || — || align=right data-sort-value="0.76" | 760 m || 
|-id=176 bgcolor=#E9E9E9
| 450176 ||  || — || October 14, 2001 || Socorro || LINEAR || — || align=right | 2.3 km || 
|-id=177 bgcolor=#fefefe
| 450177 ||  || — || October 11, 2001 || Palomar || NEAT || — || align=right data-sort-value="0.68" | 680 m || 
|-id=178 bgcolor=#fefefe
| 450178 ||  || — || October 14, 2001 || Apache Point || SDSS || — || align=right data-sort-value="0.52" | 520 m || 
|-id=179 bgcolor=#E9E9E9
| 450179 ||  || — || October 10, 2001 || Palomar || NEAT || — || align=right | 2.3 km || 
|-id=180 bgcolor=#E9E9E9
| 450180 ||  || — || October 14, 2001 || Apache Point || SDSS || — || align=right | 2.0 km || 
|-id=181 bgcolor=#E9E9E9
| 450181 ||  || — || November 10, 2001 || Socorro || LINEAR || — || align=right | 2.6 km || 
|-id=182 bgcolor=#E9E9E9
| 450182 ||  || — || November 11, 2001 || Socorro || LINEAR || — || align=right | 3.5 km || 
|-id=183 bgcolor=#E9E9E9
| 450183 ||  || — || November 11, 2001 || Socorro || LINEAR || — || align=right | 2.3 km || 
|-id=184 bgcolor=#E9E9E9
| 450184 ||  || — || November 11, 2001 || Socorro || LINEAR || — || align=right | 2.7 km || 
|-id=185 bgcolor=#FFC2E0
| 450185 ||  || — || November 19, 2001 || Socorro || LINEAR || AMO || align=right data-sort-value="0.38" | 380 m || 
|-id=186 bgcolor=#E9E9E9
| 450186 ||  || — || October 17, 2001 || Kitt Peak || Spacewatch || — || align=right | 2.9 km || 
|-id=187 bgcolor=#fefefe
| 450187 ||  || — || November 19, 2001 || Socorro || LINEAR || — || align=right data-sort-value="0.75" | 750 m || 
|-id=188 bgcolor=#E9E9E9
| 450188 ||  || — || December 10, 2001 || Kitt Peak || Spacewatch || — || align=right | 2.1 km || 
|-id=189 bgcolor=#E9E9E9
| 450189 ||  || — || November 19, 2001 || Anderson Mesa || LONEOS ||  || align=right | 2.1 km || 
|-id=190 bgcolor=#fefefe
| 450190 ||  || — || December 15, 2001 || Socorro || LINEAR || H || align=right data-sort-value="0.89" | 890 m || 
|-id=191 bgcolor=#fefefe
| 450191 ||  || — || December 15, 2001 || Socorro || LINEAR || — || align=right data-sort-value="0.89" | 890 m || 
|-id=192 bgcolor=#fefefe
| 450192 ||  || — || December 15, 2001 || Socorro || LINEAR || — || align=right data-sort-value="0.72" | 720 m || 
|-id=193 bgcolor=#fefefe
| 450193 ||  || — || December 15, 2001 || Socorro || LINEAR || — || align=right data-sort-value="0.62" | 620 m || 
|-id=194 bgcolor=#fefefe
| 450194 ||  || — || February 7, 2002 || Socorro || LINEAR || — || align=right | 1.0 km || 
|-id=195 bgcolor=#fefefe
| 450195 ||  || — || February 10, 2002 || Socorro || LINEAR || — || align=right data-sort-value="0.65" | 650 m || 
|-id=196 bgcolor=#FA8072
| 450196 ||  || — || February 10, 2002 || Socorro || LINEAR || — || align=right | 1.2 km || 
|-id=197 bgcolor=#fefefe
| 450197 ||  || — || March 5, 2002 || Kitt Peak || Spacewatch || — || align=right data-sort-value="0.83" | 830 m || 
|-id=198 bgcolor=#fefefe
| 450198 ||  || — || March 10, 2002 || Kitt Peak || Spacewatch || — || align=right data-sort-value="0.75" | 750 m || 
|-id=199 bgcolor=#d6d6d6
| 450199 ||  || — || April 12, 2002 || Socorro || LINEAR || — || align=right | 3.5 km || 
|-id=200 bgcolor=#d6d6d6
| 450200 ||  || — || April 5, 2002 || Palomar || NEAT || — || align=right | 2.8 km || 
|}

450201–450300 

|-bgcolor=#E9E9E9
| 450201 ||  || — || May 10, 2002 || Palomar || NEAT || — || align=right | 1.6 km || 
|-id=202 bgcolor=#fefefe
| 450202 ||  || — || April 10, 2002 || Socorro || LINEAR || — || align=right | 1.5 km || 
|-id=203 bgcolor=#FFC2E0
| 450203 ||  || — || July 15, 2002 || Socorro || LINEAR || AMO || align=right data-sort-value="0.39" | 390 m || 
|-id=204 bgcolor=#E9E9E9
| 450204 ||  || — || July 9, 2002 || Socorro || LINEAR || — || align=right | 1.1 km || 
|-id=205 bgcolor=#FA8072
| 450205 ||  || — || July 17, 2002 || Socorro || LINEAR || — || align=right | 1.9 km || 
|-id=206 bgcolor=#E9E9E9
| 450206 ||  || — || July 18, 2002 || Socorro || LINEAR || JUN || align=right data-sort-value="0.89" | 890 m || 
|-id=207 bgcolor=#E9E9E9
| 450207 ||  || — || July 20, 2002 || Palomar || NEAT || EUN || align=right | 1.2 km || 
|-id=208 bgcolor=#fefefe
| 450208 ||  || — || August 6, 2002 || Palomar || NEAT || — || align=right data-sort-value="0.59" | 590 m || 
|-id=209 bgcolor=#E9E9E9
| 450209 ||  || — || August 5, 2002 || Campo Imperatore || CINEOS || — || align=right data-sort-value="0.93" | 930 m || 
|-id=210 bgcolor=#E9E9E9
| 450210 ||  || — || September 14, 1998 || Kitt Peak || Spacewatch || (5) || align=right data-sort-value="0.85" | 850 m || 
|-id=211 bgcolor=#E9E9E9
| 450211 ||  || — || August 15, 2002 || Palomar || NEAT || — || align=right data-sort-value="0.86" | 860 m || 
|-id=212 bgcolor=#E9E9E9
| 450212 ||  || — || August 18, 2002 || Palomar || NEAT || — || align=right | 1.1 km || 
|-id=213 bgcolor=#E9E9E9
| 450213 ||  || — || August 16, 2002 || Palomar || NEAT || — || align=right data-sort-value="0.97" | 970 m || 
|-id=214 bgcolor=#E9E9E9
| 450214 ||  || — || September 6, 2002 || Socorro || LINEAR || — || align=right | 1.3 km || 
|-id=215 bgcolor=#E9E9E9
| 450215 ||  || — || September 12, 2002 || Palomar || NEAT || — || align=right | 1.4 km || 
|-id=216 bgcolor=#E9E9E9
| 450216 ||  || — || September 11, 2002 || Palomar || NEAT || — || align=right | 1.4 km || 
|-id=217 bgcolor=#fefefe
| 450217 ||  || — || September 1, 2002 || Palomar || NEAT || — || align=right data-sort-value="0.56" | 560 m || 
|-id=218 bgcolor=#E9E9E9
| 450218 ||  || — || September 26, 2002 || Palomar || NEAT || MIS || align=right | 2.4 km || 
|-id=219 bgcolor=#E9E9E9
| 450219 ||  || — || September 29, 2002 || Haleakala || NEAT || — || align=right | 1.5 km || 
|-id=220 bgcolor=#FA8072
| 450220 ||  || — || October 1, 2002 || Anderson Mesa || LONEOS || H || align=right data-sort-value="0.68" | 680 m || 
|-id=221 bgcolor=#E9E9E9
| 450221 ||  || — || October 1, 2002 || Socorro || LINEAR || — || align=right | 1.8 km || 
|-id=222 bgcolor=#E9E9E9
| 450222 ||  || — || October 3, 2002 || Palomar || NEAT || — || align=right | 1.5 km || 
|-id=223 bgcolor=#E9E9E9
| 450223 ||  || — || October 5, 2002 || Socorro || LINEAR || MAR || align=right | 1.3 km || 
|-id=224 bgcolor=#fefefe
| 450224 ||  || — || October 5, 2002 || Socorro || LINEAR || — || align=right data-sort-value="0.64" | 640 m || 
|-id=225 bgcolor=#E9E9E9
| 450225 ||  || — || October 5, 2002 || Socorro || LINEAR || EUN || align=right | 1.3 km || 
|-id=226 bgcolor=#fefefe
| 450226 ||  || — || October 5, 2002 || Socorro || LINEAR || — || align=right data-sort-value="0.71" | 710 m || 
|-id=227 bgcolor=#E9E9E9
| 450227 ||  || — || October 4, 2002 || Apache Point || SDSS || — || align=right data-sort-value="0.98" | 980 m || 
|-id=228 bgcolor=#E9E9E9
| 450228 ||  || — || October 5, 2002 || Apache Point || SDSS || — || align=right | 1.2 km || 
|-id=229 bgcolor=#E9E9E9
| 450229 ||  || — || October 10, 2002 || Apache Point || SDSS || — || align=right | 1.4 km || 
|-id=230 bgcolor=#E9E9E9
| 450230 ||  || — || October 10, 2002 || Apache Point || SDSS || — || align=right | 1.3 km || 
|-id=231 bgcolor=#E9E9E9
| 450231 ||  || — || October 6, 2002 || Socorro || LINEAR || (1547) || align=right | 1.5 km || 
|-id=232 bgcolor=#fefefe
| 450232 ||  || — || October 31, 2002 || Kitt Peak || Spacewatch || — || align=right data-sort-value="0.62" | 620 m || 
|-id=233 bgcolor=#E9E9E9
| 450233 ||  || — || October 30, 2002 || Haleakala || NEAT || — || align=right | 1.4 km || 
|-id=234 bgcolor=#E9E9E9
| 450234 ||  || — || November 14, 2002 || Nogales || Tenagra II Obs. || — || align=right | 1.4 km || 
|-id=235 bgcolor=#E9E9E9
| 450235 ||  || — || November 12, 2002 || Palomar || NEAT || — || align=right | 2.6 km || 
|-id=236 bgcolor=#E9E9E9
| 450236 ||  || — || November 16, 2002 || Palomar || NEAT || — || align=right | 1.00 km || 
|-id=237 bgcolor=#FFC2E0
| 450237 ||  || — || December 7, 2002 || Palomar || NEAT || ATEcritical || align=right data-sort-value="0.096" | 96 m || 
|-id=238 bgcolor=#FFC2E0
| 450238 ||  || — || December 11, 2002 || Socorro || LINEAR || AMO +1km || align=right | 1.3 km || 
|-id=239 bgcolor=#E9E9E9
| 450239 ||  || — || December 10, 2002 || Palomar || NEAT || — || align=right data-sort-value="0.99" | 990 m || 
|-id=240 bgcolor=#E9E9E9
| 450240 ||  || — || December 27, 2002 || Anderson Mesa || LONEOS || — || align=right | 2.8 km || 
|-id=241 bgcolor=#E9E9E9
| 450241 ||  || — || January 11, 2003 || Palomar || NEAT || — || align=right | 1.5 km || 
|-id=242 bgcolor=#E9E9E9
| 450242 ||  || — || February 19, 2003 || Haleakala || NEAT || — || align=right | 2.5 km || 
|-id=243 bgcolor=#fefefe
| 450243 ||  || — || March 7, 2003 || Anderson Mesa || LONEOS || — || align=right | 1.6 km || 
|-id=244 bgcolor=#d6d6d6
| 450244 ||  || — || March 26, 2003 || Kitt Peak || Spacewatch || — || align=right | 3.0 km || 
|-id=245 bgcolor=#fefefe
| 450245 ||  || — || April 7, 2003 || Kitt Peak || Spacewatch || H || align=right data-sort-value="0.63" | 630 m || 
|-id=246 bgcolor=#fefefe
| 450246 ||  || — || April 28, 2003 || Socorro || LINEAR || — || align=right data-sort-value="0.99" | 990 m || 
|-id=247 bgcolor=#d6d6d6
| 450247 ||  || — || September 16, 2003 || Kitt Peak || Spacewatch || — || align=right | 2.3 km || 
|-id=248 bgcolor=#fefefe
| 450248 ||  || — || September 26, 2003 || Apache Point || SDSS || — || align=right data-sort-value="0.80" | 800 m || 
|-id=249 bgcolor=#d6d6d6
| 450249 ||  || — || September 21, 2003 || Kitt Peak || Spacewatch || EOS || align=right | 1.8 km || 
|-id=250 bgcolor=#d6d6d6
| 450250 ||  || — || September 26, 2003 || Apache Point || SDSS || — || align=right | 2.0 km || 
|-id=251 bgcolor=#d6d6d6
| 450251 ||  || — || October 4, 2003 || Goodricke-Pigott || V. Reddy || THB || align=right | 3.9 km || 
|-id=252 bgcolor=#E9E9E9
| 450252 ||  || — || October 20, 2003 || Kitt Peak || Spacewatch || — || align=right | 1.1 km || 
|-id=253 bgcolor=#d6d6d6
| 450253 ||  || — || October 18, 2003 || Apache Point || SDSS || — || align=right | 2.6 km || 
|-id=254 bgcolor=#d6d6d6
| 450254 ||  || — || October 19, 2003 || Apache Point || SDSS || — || align=right | 3.9 km || 
|-id=255 bgcolor=#d6d6d6
| 450255 ||  || — || October 22, 2003 || Apache Point || SDSS || URS || align=right | 2.8 km || 
|-id=256 bgcolor=#d6d6d6
| 450256 ||  || — || October 22, 2003 || Apache Point || SDSS || — || align=right | 2.2 km || 
|-id=257 bgcolor=#FA8072
| 450257 ||  || — || November 16, 2003 || Kitt Peak || Spacewatch || — || align=right data-sort-value="0.31" | 310 m || 
|-id=258 bgcolor=#E9E9E9
| 450258 ||  || — || November 16, 2003 || Kitt Peak || Spacewatch || — || align=right data-sort-value="0.68" | 680 m || 
|-id=259 bgcolor=#FFC2E0
| 450259 ||  || — || November 19, 2003 || Socorro || LINEAR || APO || align=right data-sort-value="0.42" | 420 m || 
|-id=260 bgcolor=#E9E9E9
| 450260 ||  || — || November 19, 2003 || Socorro || LINEAR || — || align=right | 1.4 km || 
|-id=261 bgcolor=#d6d6d6
| 450261 ||  || — || November 19, 2003 || Kitt Peak || Spacewatch || — || align=right | 4.8 km || 
|-id=262 bgcolor=#E9E9E9
| 450262 ||  || — || November 21, 2003 || Socorro || LINEAR || EUN || align=right | 1.4 km || 
|-id=263 bgcolor=#FFC2E0
| 450263 ||  || — || November 30, 2003 || Socorro || LINEAR || APOPHA || align=right data-sort-value="0.56" | 560 m || 
|-id=264 bgcolor=#E9E9E9
| 450264 ||  || — || November 19, 2003 || Palomar || NEAT || — || align=right data-sort-value="0.98" | 980 m || 
|-id=265 bgcolor=#C2E0FF
| 450265 ||  || — || November 21, 2003 || Kitt Peak || Spacewatch || plutino || align=right | 230 km || 
|-id=266 bgcolor=#E9E9E9
| 450266 ||  || — || December 17, 2003 || Socorro || LINEAR || MAR || align=right | 1.4 km || 
|-id=267 bgcolor=#E9E9E9
| 450267 ||  || — || December 18, 2003 || Socorro || LINEAR || — || align=right | 1.2 km || 
|-id=268 bgcolor=#E9E9E9
| 450268 ||  || — || December 19, 2003 || Kitt Peak || Spacewatch || — || align=right data-sort-value="0.88" | 880 m || 
|-id=269 bgcolor=#E9E9E9
| 450269 ||  || — || December 28, 2003 || Socorro || LINEAR || — || align=right | 1.3 km || 
|-id=270 bgcolor=#FFC2E0
| 450270 ||  || — || January 4, 2004 || Socorro || LINEAR || APOPHA || align=right data-sort-value="0.27" | 270 m || 
|-id=271 bgcolor=#E9E9E9
| 450271 ||  || — || December 30, 2003 || Kitt Peak || Spacewatch || — || align=right | 1.0 km || 
|-id=272 bgcolor=#E9E9E9
| 450272 ||  || — || January 16, 2004 || Kitt Peak || Spacewatch || (5) || align=right data-sort-value="0.77" | 770 m || 
|-id=273 bgcolor=#E9E9E9
| 450273 ||  || — || January 19, 2004 || Haleakala || NEAT || — || align=right | 2.1 km || 
|-id=274 bgcolor=#FA8072
| 450274 ||  || — || January 30, 2004 || Socorro || LINEAR || — || align=right | 1.4 km || 
|-id=275 bgcolor=#E9E9E9
| 450275 ||  || — || January 19, 2004 || Kitt Peak || Spacewatch || — || align=right data-sort-value="0.80" | 800 m || 
|-id=276 bgcolor=#E9E9E9
| 450276 ||  || — || January 22, 2004 || Socorro || LINEAR || MAR || align=right | 1.1 km || 
|-id=277 bgcolor=#E9E9E9
| 450277 ||  || — || February 13, 2004 || Palomar || NEAT || (1547) || align=right | 1.5 km || 
|-id=278 bgcolor=#E9E9E9
| 450278 ||  || — || February 13, 2004 || Anderson Mesa || LONEOS || RAF || align=right | 1.1 km || 
|-id=279 bgcolor=#E9E9E9
| 450279 ||  || — || February 16, 2004 || Kitt Peak || Spacewatch || — || align=right | 2.1 km || 
|-id=280 bgcolor=#E9E9E9
| 450280 ||  || — || February 17, 2004 || Socorro || LINEAR || — || align=right | 1.3 km || 
|-id=281 bgcolor=#E9E9E9
| 450281 ||  || — || March 13, 2004 || Palomar || NEAT || — || align=right | 1.8 km || 
|-id=282 bgcolor=#E9E9E9
| 450282 ||  || — || March 15, 2004 || Catalina || CSS || — || align=right | 1.1 km || 
|-id=283 bgcolor=#E9E9E9
| 450283 ||  || — || February 26, 2004 || Socorro || LINEAR || — || align=right | 1.2 km || 
|-id=284 bgcolor=#E9E9E9
| 450284 ||  || — || March 19, 2004 || Catalina || CSS || — || align=right | 2.8 km || 
|-id=285 bgcolor=#fefefe
| 450285 ||  || — || March 17, 2004 || Kitt Peak || Spacewatch || — || align=right data-sort-value="0.62" | 620 m || 
|-id=286 bgcolor=#E9E9E9
| 450286 ||  || — || April 9, 2004 || Siding Spring || SSS || — || align=right | 2.7 km || 
|-id=287 bgcolor=#E9E9E9
| 450287 ||  || — || April 21, 2004 || Siding Spring || SSS || — || align=right | 1.1 km || 
|-id=288 bgcolor=#E9E9E9
| 450288 ||  || — || April 22, 2004 || Kitt Peak || Spacewatch || — || align=right | 1.4 km || 
|-id=289 bgcolor=#E9E9E9
| 450289 ||  || — || May 9, 2004 || Kitt Peak || Spacewatch || JUN || align=right | 1.1 km || 
|-id=290 bgcolor=#fefefe
| 450290 ||  || — || May 14, 2004 || Socorro || LINEAR || H || align=right data-sort-value="0.81" | 810 m || 
|-id=291 bgcolor=#fefefe
| 450291 ||  || — || May 15, 2004 || Socorro || LINEAR || H || align=right data-sort-value="0.79" | 790 m || 
|-id=292 bgcolor=#FA8072
| 450292 ||  || — || May 17, 2004 || Socorro || LINEAR || — || align=right | 1.7 km || 
|-id=293 bgcolor=#FFC2E0
| 450293 ||  || — || June 12, 2004 || Socorro || LINEAR || APOPHA || align=right data-sort-value="0.62" | 620 m || 
|-id=294 bgcolor=#d6d6d6
| 450294 ||  || — || June 14, 2004 || Kitt Peak || Spacewatch || — || align=right | 3.9 km || 
|-id=295 bgcolor=#fefefe
| 450295 ||  || — || June 16, 2004 || Kitt Peak || Spacewatch || — || align=right data-sort-value="0.64" | 640 m || 
|-id=296 bgcolor=#fefefe
| 450296 ||  || — || August 9, 2004 || Socorro || LINEAR || — || align=right data-sort-value="0.82" | 820 m || 
|-id=297 bgcolor=#fefefe
| 450297 Csákánybéla ||  ||  || August 8, 2004 || Piszkéstető || K. Sárneczky, G. Szabó || — || align=right data-sort-value="0.70" | 700 m || 
|-id=298 bgcolor=#fefefe
| 450298 ||  || — || August 8, 2004 || Palomar || NEAT || — || align=right data-sort-value="0.82" | 820 m || 
|-id=299 bgcolor=#fefefe
| 450299 ||  || — || August 12, 2004 || Socorro || LINEAR || — || align=right data-sort-value="0.65" | 650 m || 
|-id=300 bgcolor=#FFC2E0
| 450300 ||  || — || August 24, 2004 || Siding Spring || SSS || ATEPHA || align=right data-sort-value="0.28" | 280 m || 
|}

450301–450400 

|-bgcolor=#d6d6d6
| 450301 ||  || — || August 19, 2004 || Socorro || LINEAR || — || align=right | 3.5 km || 
|-id=302 bgcolor=#FA8072
| 450302 ||  || — || August 27, 2004 || Socorro || LINEAR || — || align=right | 1.2 km || 
|-id=303 bgcolor=#fefefe
| 450303 ||  || — || September 6, 2004 || Socorro || LINEAR || H || align=right data-sort-value="0.87" | 870 m || 
|-id=304 bgcolor=#fefefe
| 450304 ||  || — || September 8, 2004 || Socorro || LINEAR || — || align=right data-sort-value="0.67" | 670 m || 
|-id=305 bgcolor=#d6d6d6
| 450305 ||  || — || September 7, 2004 || Kitt Peak || Spacewatch || — || align=right | 2.2 km || 
|-id=306 bgcolor=#fefefe
| 450306 ||  || — || September 8, 2004 || Socorro || LINEAR || NYS || align=right data-sort-value="0.63" | 630 m || 
|-id=307 bgcolor=#fefefe
| 450307 ||  || — || September 10, 2004 || Socorro || LINEAR || — || align=right data-sort-value="0.90" | 900 m || 
|-id=308 bgcolor=#d6d6d6
| 450308 ||  || — || September 10, 2004 || Socorro || LINEAR || — || align=right | 3.8 km || 
|-id=309 bgcolor=#fefefe
| 450309 ||  || — || September 7, 2004 || Palomar || NEAT || H || align=right data-sort-value="0.76" | 760 m || 
|-id=310 bgcolor=#fefefe
| 450310 ||  || — || September 10, 2004 || Socorro || LINEAR || — || align=right data-sort-value="0.73" | 730 m || 
|-id=311 bgcolor=#d6d6d6
| 450311 ||  || — || September 10, 2004 || Socorro || LINEAR || — || align=right | 3.6 km || 
|-id=312 bgcolor=#d6d6d6
| 450312 ||  || — || September 11, 2004 || Socorro || LINEAR || — || align=right | 3.3 km || 
|-id=313 bgcolor=#d6d6d6
| 450313 ||  || — || September 12, 2004 || Socorro || LINEAR || — || align=right | 3.3 km || 
|-id=314 bgcolor=#fefefe
| 450314 ||  || — || September 10, 2004 || Socorro || LINEAR || NYS || align=right data-sort-value="0.66" | 660 m || 
|-id=315 bgcolor=#fefefe
| 450315 ||  || — || September 15, 2004 || Socorro || LINEAR || — || align=right | 1.6 km || 
|-id=316 bgcolor=#d6d6d6
| 450316 ||  || — || September 6, 2004 || Palomar || NEAT || — || align=right | 3.3 km || 
|-id=317 bgcolor=#fefefe
| 450317 ||  || — || September 15, 2004 || Anderson Mesa || LONEOS || — || align=right data-sort-value="0.86" | 860 m || 
|-id=318 bgcolor=#d6d6d6
| 450318 ||  || — || September 16, 2004 || Kitt Peak || Spacewatch || — || align=right | 2.5 km || 
|-id=319 bgcolor=#d6d6d6
| 450319 ||  || — || September 17, 2004 || Anderson Mesa || LONEOS || — || align=right | 2.6 km || 
|-id=320 bgcolor=#d6d6d6
| 450320 ||  || — || September 9, 2004 || Kitt Peak || Spacewatch || — || align=right | 3.3 km || 
|-id=321 bgcolor=#fefefe
| 450321 ||  || — || September 9, 2004 || Socorro || LINEAR || — || align=right data-sort-value="0.73" | 730 m || 
|-id=322 bgcolor=#fefefe
| 450322 ||  || — || September 22, 2004 || Kitt Peak || Spacewatch || — || align=right data-sort-value="0.73" | 730 m || 
|-id=323 bgcolor=#d6d6d6
| 450323 ||  || — || September 13, 2004 || Anderson Mesa || LONEOS || — || align=right | 3.1 km || 
|-id=324 bgcolor=#d6d6d6
| 450324 ||  || — || October 4, 2004 || Kitt Peak || Spacewatch || — || align=right | 3.2 km || 
|-id=325 bgcolor=#d6d6d6
| 450325 ||  || — || October 4, 2004 || Kitt Peak || Spacewatch || — || align=right | 2.3 km || 
|-id=326 bgcolor=#d6d6d6
| 450326 ||  || — || September 17, 2004 || Socorro || LINEAR || — || align=right | 2.5 km || 
|-id=327 bgcolor=#fefefe
| 450327 ||  || — || October 4, 2004 || Kitt Peak || Spacewatch || — || align=right data-sort-value="0.78" | 780 m || 
|-id=328 bgcolor=#fefefe
| 450328 ||  || — || October 4, 2004 || Kitt Peak || Spacewatch || V || align=right data-sort-value="0.62" | 620 m || 
|-id=329 bgcolor=#fefefe
| 450329 ||  || — || October 5, 2004 || Kitt Peak || Spacewatch || — || align=right data-sort-value="0.97" | 970 m || 
|-id=330 bgcolor=#d6d6d6
| 450330 ||  || — || October 6, 2004 || Kitt Peak || Spacewatch || — || align=right | 1.8 km || 
|-id=331 bgcolor=#d6d6d6
| 450331 ||  || — || September 7, 2004 || Kitt Peak || Spacewatch || — || align=right | 2.6 km || 
|-id=332 bgcolor=#d6d6d6
| 450332 ||  || — || October 5, 2004 || Kitt Peak || Spacewatch || — || align=right | 2.2 km || 
|-id=333 bgcolor=#fefefe
| 450333 ||  || — || October 7, 2004 || Kitt Peak || Spacewatch || — || align=right data-sort-value="0.73" | 730 m || 
|-id=334 bgcolor=#d6d6d6
| 450334 ||  || — || October 7, 2004 || Kitt Peak || Spacewatch || — || align=right | 2.2 km || 
|-id=335 bgcolor=#fefefe
| 450335 ||  || — || October 4, 2004 || Kitt Peak || Spacewatch || — || align=right | 1.4 km || 
|-id=336 bgcolor=#fefefe
| 450336 ||  || — || October 6, 2004 || Kitt Peak || Spacewatch || NYS || align=right data-sort-value="0.58" | 580 m || 
|-id=337 bgcolor=#fefefe
| 450337 ||  || — || October 6, 2004 || Kitt Peak || Spacewatch || MAS || align=right data-sort-value="0.53" | 530 m || 
|-id=338 bgcolor=#fefefe
| 450338 ||  || — || October 7, 2004 || Kitt Peak || Spacewatch || critical || align=right data-sort-value="0.59" | 590 m || 
|-id=339 bgcolor=#d6d6d6
| 450339 ||  || — || September 22, 2004 || Socorro || LINEAR || — || align=right | 2.9 km || 
|-id=340 bgcolor=#fefefe
| 450340 ||  || — || October 7, 2004 || Kitt Peak || Spacewatch || MAS || align=right data-sort-value="0.61" | 610 m || 
|-id=341 bgcolor=#d6d6d6
| 450341 ||  || — || October 7, 2004 || Kitt Peak || Spacewatch || HYG || align=right | 2.5 km || 
|-id=342 bgcolor=#d6d6d6
| 450342 ||  || — || October 7, 2004 || Kitt Peak || Spacewatch || — || align=right | 2.4 km || 
|-id=343 bgcolor=#d6d6d6
| 450343 ||  || — || October 8, 2004 || Kitt Peak || Spacewatch || — || align=right | 2.3 km || 
|-id=344 bgcolor=#d6d6d6
| 450344 ||  || — || October 9, 2004 || Kitt Peak || Spacewatch || — || align=right | 2.9 km || 
|-id=345 bgcolor=#d6d6d6
| 450345 ||  || — || October 9, 2004 || Kitt Peak || Spacewatch || THM || align=right | 2.4 km || 
|-id=346 bgcolor=#d6d6d6
| 450346 ||  || — || October 10, 2004 || Socorro || LINEAR || — || align=right | 3.5 km || 
|-id=347 bgcolor=#d6d6d6
| 450347 ||  || — || October 11, 2004 || Kitt Peak || Spacewatch || — || align=right | 2.5 km || 
|-id=348 bgcolor=#d6d6d6
| 450348 ||  || — || October 14, 2004 || Palomar || NEAT || — || align=right | 3.0 km || 
|-id=349 bgcolor=#d6d6d6
| 450349 ||  || — || November 3, 2004 || Kitt Peak || Spacewatch || (5651) || align=right | 3.8 km || 
|-id=350 bgcolor=#d6d6d6
| 450350 ||  || — || November 3, 2004 || Kitt Peak || Spacewatch || — || align=right | 3.0 km || 
|-id=351 bgcolor=#fefefe
| 450351 ||  || — || November 3, 2004 || Palomar || NEAT || — || align=right data-sort-value="0.78" | 780 m || 
|-id=352 bgcolor=#fefefe
| 450352 ||  || — || November 4, 2004 || Kitt Peak || Spacewatch || — || align=right data-sort-value="0.58" | 580 m || 
|-id=353 bgcolor=#d6d6d6
| 450353 ||  || — || October 7, 2004 || Kitt Peak || Spacewatch || — || align=right | 3.2 km || 
|-id=354 bgcolor=#d6d6d6
| 450354 ||  || — || October 23, 2004 || Kitt Peak || Spacewatch || — || align=right | 3.5 km || 
|-id=355 bgcolor=#fefefe
| 450355 ||  || — || October 10, 2004 || Kitt Peak || Spacewatch || MAS || align=right data-sort-value="0.74" | 740 m || 
|-id=356 bgcolor=#FA8072
| 450356 ||  || — || November 3, 2004 || Anderson Mesa || LONEOS || — || align=right data-sort-value="0.67" | 670 m || 
|-id=357 bgcolor=#fefefe
| 450357 ||  || — || November 19, 2004 || Catalina || CSS || ERI || align=right | 1.6 km || 
|-id=358 bgcolor=#d6d6d6
| 450358 ||  || — || December 9, 2004 || Catalina || CSS || — || align=right | 2.7 km || 
|-id=359 bgcolor=#d6d6d6
| 450359 ||  || — || December 12, 2004 || Socorro || LINEAR || — || align=right | 4.7 km || 
|-id=360 bgcolor=#fefefe
| 450360 ||  || — || December 11, 2004 || Kitt Peak || Spacewatch || NYS || align=right data-sort-value="0.64" | 640 m || 
|-id=361 bgcolor=#fefefe
| 450361 ||  || — || December 9, 2004 || Catalina || CSS || — || align=right | 1.1 km || 
|-id=362 bgcolor=#d6d6d6
| 450362 ||  || — || December 10, 2004 || Socorro || LINEAR || Tj (2.99) || align=right | 4.0 km || 
|-id=363 bgcolor=#fefefe
| 450363 ||  || — || December 18, 2004 || Mount Lemmon || Mount Lemmon Survey || — || align=right data-sort-value="0.86" | 860 m || 
|-id=364 bgcolor=#d6d6d6
| 450364 ||  || — || January 7, 2005 || Catalina || CSS || — || align=right | 3.2 km || 
|-id=365 bgcolor=#d6d6d6
| 450365 ||  || — || December 13, 2004 || Kitt Peak || Spacewatch || — || align=right | 3.3 km || 
|-id=366 bgcolor=#fefefe
| 450366 ||  || — || January 15, 2005 || Socorro || LINEAR || — || align=right data-sort-value="0.77" | 770 m || 
|-id=367 bgcolor=#d6d6d6
| 450367 ||  || — || February 1, 2005 || Kitt Peak || Spacewatch || Tj (2.97) || align=right | 3.9 km || 
|-id=368 bgcolor=#FA8072
| 450368 ||  || — || February 9, 2005 || Anderson Mesa || LONEOS || — || align=right data-sort-value="0.76" | 760 m || 
|-id=369 bgcolor=#fefefe
| 450369 ||  || — || March 4, 2005 || Mount Lemmon || Mount Lemmon Survey || — || align=right data-sort-value="0.73" | 730 m || 
|-id=370 bgcolor=#E9E9E9
| 450370 ||  || — || March 9, 2005 || Mount Lemmon || Mount Lemmon Survey || — || align=right data-sort-value="0.79" | 790 m || 
|-id=371 bgcolor=#d6d6d6
| 450371 ||  || — || March 2, 2005 || Socorro || LINEAR || — || align=right | 6.4 km || 
|-id=372 bgcolor=#E9E9E9
| 450372 ||  || — || April 2, 2005 || Catalina || CSS || — || align=right | 2.0 km || 
|-id=373 bgcolor=#E9E9E9
| 450373 ||  || — || April 4, 2005 || Catalina || CSS || JUN || align=right | 1.1 km || 
|-id=374 bgcolor=#E9E9E9
| 450374 ||  || — || March 8, 2005 || Mount Lemmon || Mount Lemmon Survey || — || align=right | 1.3 km || 
|-id=375 bgcolor=#E9E9E9
| 450375 ||  || — || April 10, 2005 || Kitt Peak || Spacewatch || — || align=right | 1.3 km || 
|-id=376 bgcolor=#E9E9E9
| 450376 ||  || — || April 10, 2005 || Kitt Peak || Spacewatch || — || align=right | 1.4 km || 
|-id=377 bgcolor=#E9E9E9
| 450377 ||  || — || April 4, 2005 || Mount Lemmon || Mount Lemmon Survey || — || align=right | 1.7 km || 
|-id=378 bgcolor=#E9E9E9
| 450378 ||  || — || May 4, 2005 || Siding Spring || SSS || — || align=right | 1.7 km || 
|-id=379 bgcolor=#E9E9E9
| 450379 ||  || — || May 8, 2005 || Kitt Peak || Spacewatch || — || align=right | 1.5 km || 
|-id=380 bgcolor=#E9E9E9
| 450380 ||  || — || May 10, 2005 || Mount Lemmon || Mount Lemmon Survey || — || align=right | 3.1 km || 
|-id=381 bgcolor=#E9E9E9
| 450381 ||  || — || May 3, 2005 || Kitt Peak || Spacewatch || — || align=right | 1.4 km || 
|-id=382 bgcolor=#E9E9E9
| 450382 ||  || — || May 14, 2005 || Kitt Peak || Spacewatch || — || align=right | 2.2 km || 
|-id=383 bgcolor=#E9E9E9
| 450383 ||  || — || May 20, 2005 || Mount Lemmon || Mount Lemmon Survey || — || align=right | 2.0 km || 
|-id=384 bgcolor=#E9E9E9
| 450384 ||  || — || June 8, 2005 || Kitt Peak || Spacewatch || — || align=right | 1.8 km || 
|-id=385 bgcolor=#E9E9E9
| 450385 ||  || — || June 29, 2005 || Kitt Peak || Spacewatch || — || align=right | 2.2 km || 
|-id=386 bgcolor=#E9E9E9
| 450386 ||  || — || July 4, 2005 || Kitt Peak || Spacewatch || — || align=right | 2.0 km || 
|-id=387 bgcolor=#E9E9E9
| 450387 ||  || — || July 4, 2005 || Kitt Peak || Spacewatch || — || align=right | 2.6 km || 
|-id=388 bgcolor=#E9E9E9
| 450388 ||  || — || July 4, 2005 || Kitt Peak || Spacewatch || — || align=right | 1.7 km || 
|-id=389 bgcolor=#E9E9E9
| 450389 ||  || — || July 29, 2005 || Palomar || NEAT || — || align=right | 2.3 km || 
|-id=390 bgcolor=#fefefe
| 450390 Pitchcomment ||  ||  || August 8, 2005 || Vicques || M. Ory || — || align=right data-sort-value="0.54" | 540 m || 
|-id=391 bgcolor=#E9E9E9
| 450391 ||  || — || August 29, 2005 || Kitt Peak || Spacewatch || — || align=right | 2.0 km || 
|-id=392 bgcolor=#d6d6d6
| 450392 ||  || — || August 27, 2005 || Palomar || NEAT || — || align=right | 2.4 km || 
|-id=393 bgcolor=#E9E9E9
| 450393 ||  || — || August 28, 2005 || Kitt Peak || Spacewatch || DOR || align=right | 2.4 km || 
|-id=394 bgcolor=#fefefe
| 450394 ||  || — || August 28, 2005 || Kitt Peak || Spacewatch || — || align=right data-sort-value="0.63" | 630 m || 
|-id=395 bgcolor=#d6d6d6
| 450395 ||  || — || September 26, 2005 || Kitt Peak || Spacewatch || — || align=right | 2.0 km || 
|-id=396 bgcolor=#d6d6d6
| 450396 ||  || — || September 26, 2005 || Kitt Peak || Spacewatch || — || align=right | 3.7 km || 
|-id=397 bgcolor=#d6d6d6
| 450397 ||  || — || September 24, 2005 || Kitt Peak || Spacewatch || KOR || align=right | 1.3 km || 
|-id=398 bgcolor=#d6d6d6
| 450398 ||  || — || September 25, 2005 || Kitt Peak || Spacewatch || KOR || align=right | 1.3 km || 
|-id=399 bgcolor=#d6d6d6
| 450399 ||  || — || September 28, 2005 || Palomar || NEAT || — || align=right | 2.4 km || 
|-id=400 bgcolor=#fefefe
| 450400 ||  || — || September 29, 2005 || Kitt Peak || Spacewatch || — || align=right data-sort-value="0.61" | 610 m || 
|}

450401–450500 

|-bgcolor=#d6d6d6
| 450401 ||  || — || September 30, 2005 || Mount Lemmon || Mount Lemmon Survey || — || align=right | 1.5 km || 
|-id=402 bgcolor=#fefefe
| 450402 ||  || — || September 30, 2005 || Palomar || NEAT || — || align=right data-sort-value="0.85" | 850 m || 
|-id=403 bgcolor=#d6d6d6
| 450403 ||  || — || September 30, 2005 || Kitt Peak || Spacewatch || — || align=right | 2.1 km || 
|-id=404 bgcolor=#d6d6d6
| 450404 ||  || — || September 30, 2005 || Mount Lemmon || Mount Lemmon Survey || — || align=right | 1.9 km || 
|-id=405 bgcolor=#FA8072
| 450405 ||  || — || August 29, 2005 || Socorro || LINEAR || — || align=right data-sort-value="0.63" | 630 m || 
|-id=406 bgcolor=#d6d6d6
| 450406 ||  || — || September 29, 2005 || Catalina || CSS || BRA || align=right | 1.7 km || 
|-id=407 bgcolor=#d6d6d6
| 450407 ||  || — || October 1, 2005 || Mount Lemmon || Mount Lemmon Survey || — || align=right | 1.6 km || 
|-id=408 bgcolor=#fefefe
| 450408 ||  || — || September 23, 2005 || Kitt Peak || Spacewatch || — || align=right data-sort-value="0.65" | 650 m || 
|-id=409 bgcolor=#fefefe
| 450409 ||  || — || October 6, 2005 || Mount Lemmon || Mount Lemmon Survey || — || align=right data-sort-value="0.65" | 650 m || 
|-id=410 bgcolor=#d6d6d6
| 450410 ||  || — || October 2, 2005 || Mount Lemmon || Mount Lemmon Survey || KOR || align=right | 1.2 km || 
|-id=411 bgcolor=#d6d6d6
| 450411 ||  || — || October 3, 2005 || Catalina || CSS || — || align=right | 2.7 km || 
|-id=412 bgcolor=#d6d6d6
| 450412 ||  || — || October 7, 2005 || Kitt Peak || Spacewatch || KOR || align=right data-sort-value="0.99" | 990 m || 
|-id=413 bgcolor=#fefefe
| 450413 ||  || — || September 29, 2005 || Mount Lemmon || Mount Lemmon Survey || — || align=right data-sort-value="0.50" | 500 m || 
|-id=414 bgcolor=#fefefe
| 450414 ||  || — || October 7, 2005 || Kitt Peak || Spacewatch || — || align=right data-sort-value="0.75" | 750 m || 
|-id=415 bgcolor=#fefefe
| 450415 ||  || — || September 29, 2005 || Kitt Peak || Spacewatch || — || align=right data-sort-value="0.58" | 580 m || 
|-id=416 bgcolor=#fefefe
| 450416 ||  || — || September 29, 2005 || Kitt Peak || Spacewatch || — || align=right data-sort-value="0.76" | 760 m || 
|-id=417 bgcolor=#d6d6d6
| 450417 ||  || — || September 29, 2005 || Kitt Peak || Spacewatch || — || align=right | 2.0 km || 
|-id=418 bgcolor=#d6d6d6
| 450418 ||  || — || October 1, 2005 || Kitt Peak || Spacewatch || KOR || align=right | 1.0 km || 
|-id=419 bgcolor=#fefefe
| 450419 ||  || — || October 3, 2005 || Catalina || CSS || — || align=right data-sort-value="0.94" | 940 m || 
|-id=420 bgcolor=#fefefe
| 450420 ||  || — || October 22, 2005 || Kitt Peak || Spacewatch || — || align=right data-sort-value="0.72" | 720 m || 
|-id=421 bgcolor=#fefefe
| 450421 ||  || — || October 22, 2005 || Kitt Peak || Spacewatch || — || align=right data-sort-value="0.71" | 710 m || 
|-id=422 bgcolor=#d6d6d6
| 450422 ||  || — || October 2, 2005 || Mount Lemmon || Mount Lemmon Survey || KOR || align=right | 1.00 km || 
|-id=423 bgcolor=#d6d6d6
| 450423 ||  || — || September 24, 2005 || Kitt Peak || Spacewatch || — || align=right | 2.1 km || 
|-id=424 bgcolor=#d6d6d6
| 450424 ||  || — || October 1, 2005 || Mount Lemmon || Mount Lemmon Survey || — || align=right | 1.7 km || 
|-id=425 bgcolor=#d6d6d6
| 450425 ||  || — || October 24, 2005 || Kitt Peak || Spacewatch || EOS || align=right | 1.9 km || 
|-id=426 bgcolor=#FA8072
| 450426 ||  || — || October 23, 2005 || Palomar || NEAT || H || align=right data-sort-value="0.83" | 830 m || 
|-id=427 bgcolor=#d6d6d6
| 450427 ||  || — || October 22, 2005 || Kitt Peak || Spacewatch || — || align=right | 2.2 km || 
|-id=428 bgcolor=#d6d6d6
| 450428 ||  || — || October 22, 2005 || Kitt Peak || Spacewatch || — || align=right | 2.4 km || 
|-id=429 bgcolor=#d6d6d6
| 450429 ||  || — || October 22, 2005 || Kitt Peak || Spacewatch || — || align=right | 1.8 km || 
|-id=430 bgcolor=#d6d6d6
| 450430 ||  || — || October 24, 2005 || Kitt Peak || Spacewatch || — || align=right | 2.4 km || 
|-id=431 bgcolor=#fefefe
| 450431 ||  || — || October 25, 2005 || Kitt Peak || Spacewatch || — || align=right data-sort-value="0.61" | 610 m || 
|-id=432 bgcolor=#fefefe
| 450432 ||  || — || October 25, 2005 || Kitt Peak || Spacewatch || — || align=right data-sort-value="0.67" | 670 m || 
|-id=433 bgcolor=#fefefe
| 450433 ||  || — || October 27, 2005 || Kitt Peak || Spacewatch || — || align=right data-sort-value="0.58" | 580 m || 
|-id=434 bgcolor=#d6d6d6
| 450434 ||  || — || October 22, 2005 || Palomar || NEAT || — || align=right | 1.9 km || 
|-id=435 bgcolor=#fefefe
| 450435 ||  || — || October 25, 2005 || Mount Lemmon || Mount Lemmon Survey || — || align=right data-sort-value="0.70" | 700 m || 
|-id=436 bgcolor=#fefefe
| 450436 ||  || — || October 27, 2005 || Kitt Peak || Spacewatch || — || align=right data-sort-value="0.87" | 870 m || 
|-id=437 bgcolor=#fefefe
| 450437 ||  || — || October 28, 2005 || Catalina || CSS || — || align=right data-sort-value="0.76" | 760 m || 
|-id=438 bgcolor=#d6d6d6
| 450438 ||  || — || October 1, 2005 || Kitt Peak || Spacewatch || — || align=right | 1.9 km || 
|-id=439 bgcolor=#d6d6d6
| 450439 ||  || — || October 1, 2005 || Mount Lemmon || Mount Lemmon Survey || — || align=right | 1.8 km || 
|-id=440 bgcolor=#fefefe
| 450440 ||  || — || October 29, 2005 || Catalina || CSS || — || align=right data-sort-value="0.58" | 580 m || 
|-id=441 bgcolor=#d6d6d6
| 450441 ||  || — || October 25, 2005 || Mount Lemmon || Mount Lemmon Survey || KOR || align=right | 1.2 km || 
|-id=442 bgcolor=#fefefe
| 450442 ||  || — || October 22, 2005 || Kitt Peak || Spacewatch || — || align=right data-sort-value="0.65" | 650 m || 
|-id=443 bgcolor=#d6d6d6
| 450443 ||  || — || October 26, 2005 || Kitt Peak || Spacewatch || — || align=right | 1.8 km || 
|-id=444 bgcolor=#FA8072
| 450444 ||  || — || October 25, 2005 || Mount Lemmon || Mount Lemmon Survey || H || align=right data-sort-value="0.38" | 380 m || 
|-id=445 bgcolor=#d6d6d6
| 450445 ||  || — || October 25, 2005 || Kitt Peak || Spacewatch || — || align=right | 2.5 km || 
|-id=446 bgcolor=#fefefe
| 450446 ||  || — || October 25, 2005 || Kitt Peak || Spacewatch || — || align=right data-sort-value="0.54" | 540 m || 
|-id=447 bgcolor=#fefefe
| 450447 ||  || — || October 28, 2005 || Catalina || CSS || — || align=right data-sort-value="0.69" | 690 m || 
|-id=448 bgcolor=#fefefe
| 450448 ||  || — || October 7, 2005 || Mount Lemmon || Mount Lemmon Survey || — || align=right data-sort-value="0.75" | 750 m || 
|-id=449 bgcolor=#d6d6d6
| 450449 ||  || — || October 31, 2005 || Mount Lemmon || Mount Lemmon Survey || — || align=right | 3.0 km || 
|-id=450 bgcolor=#fefefe
| 450450 ||  || — || October 25, 2005 || Kitt Peak || Spacewatch || — || align=right data-sort-value="0.52" | 520 m || 
|-id=451 bgcolor=#d6d6d6
| 450451 ||  || — || September 29, 2005 || Catalina || CSS || BRA || align=right | 1.6 km || 
|-id=452 bgcolor=#d6d6d6
| 450452 ||  || — || October 30, 2005 || Kitt Peak || Spacewatch || — || align=right | 2.0 km || 
|-id=453 bgcolor=#fefefe
| 450453 ||  || — || October 26, 2005 || Kitt Peak || Spacewatch || — || align=right data-sort-value="0.65" | 650 m || 
|-id=454 bgcolor=#fefefe
| 450454 ||  || — || October 28, 2005 || Kitt Peak || Spacewatch || — || align=right data-sort-value="0.57" | 570 m || 
|-id=455 bgcolor=#fefefe
| 450455 ||  || — || October 24, 2005 || Kitt Peak || Spacewatch || V || align=right data-sort-value="0.59" | 590 m || 
|-id=456 bgcolor=#fefefe
| 450456 ||  || — || October 25, 2005 || Mount Lemmon || Mount Lemmon Survey || — || align=right data-sort-value="0.61" | 610 m || 
|-id=457 bgcolor=#d6d6d6
| 450457 ||  || — || October 24, 2005 || Kitt Peak || Spacewatch || — || align=right | 1.9 km || 
|-id=458 bgcolor=#fefefe
| 450458 ||  || — || November 4, 2005 || Mount Lemmon || Mount Lemmon Survey || — || align=right data-sort-value="0.62" | 620 m || 
|-id=459 bgcolor=#d6d6d6
| 450459 ||  || — || October 26, 2005 || Kitt Peak || Spacewatch || — || align=right | 1.9 km || 
|-id=460 bgcolor=#fefefe
| 450460 ||  || — || November 1, 2005 || Mount Lemmon || Mount Lemmon Survey || — || align=right data-sort-value="0.75" | 750 m || 
|-id=461 bgcolor=#fefefe
| 450461 ||  || — || November 22, 2005 || Kitt Peak || Spacewatch || — || align=right data-sort-value="0.64" | 640 m || 
|-id=462 bgcolor=#d6d6d6
| 450462 ||  || — || November 6, 2005 || Kitt Peak || Spacewatch || BRA || align=right | 1.5 km || 
|-id=463 bgcolor=#d6d6d6
| 450463 ||  || — || November 21, 2005 || Kitt Peak || Spacewatch || — || align=right | 2.6 km || 
|-id=464 bgcolor=#fefefe
| 450464 ||  || — || November 21, 2005 || Kitt Peak || Spacewatch || — || align=right data-sort-value="0.65" | 650 m || 
|-id=465 bgcolor=#fefefe
| 450465 ||  || — || November 28, 2005 || Mount Lemmon || Mount Lemmon Survey || — || align=right data-sort-value="0.71" | 710 m || 
|-id=466 bgcolor=#fefefe
| 450466 ||  || — || October 29, 2005 || Mount Lemmon || Mount Lemmon Survey || — || align=right data-sort-value="0.65" | 650 m || 
|-id=467 bgcolor=#fefefe
| 450467 ||  || — || November 25, 2005 || Mount Lemmon || Mount Lemmon Survey || — || align=right data-sort-value="0.59" | 590 m || 
|-id=468 bgcolor=#d6d6d6
| 450468 ||  || — || November 25, 2005 || Mount Lemmon || Mount Lemmon Survey || EOS || align=right | 2.0 km || 
|-id=469 bgcolor=#d6d6d6
| 450469 ||  || — || November 25, 2005 || Mount Lemmon || Mount Lemmon Survey || EOS || align=right | 1.7 km || 
|-id=470 bgcolor=#d6d6d6
| 450470 ||  || — || November 25, 2005 || Mount Lemmon || Mount Lemmon Survey || — || align=right | 2.9 km || 
|-id=471 bgcolor=#d6d6d6
| 450471 ||  || — || November 26, 2005 || Mount Lemmon || Mount Lemmon Survey || — || align=right | 2.2 km || 
|-id=472 bgcolor=#fefefe
| 450472 ||  || — || November 25, 2005 || Kitt Peak || Spacewatch || — || align=right | 1.0 km || 
|-id=473 bgcolor=#d6d6d6
| 450473 ||  || — || November 29, 2005 || Kitt Peak || Spacewatch || — || align=right | 2.3 km || 
|-id=474 bgcolor=#d6d6d6
| 450474 ||  || — || November 30, 2005 || Catalina || CSS || — || align=right | 7.1 km || 
|-id=475 bgcolor=#fefefe
| 450475 ||  || — || November 29, 2005 || Mount Lemmon || Mount Lemmon Survey || — || align=right data-sort-value="0.69" | 690 m || 
|-id=476 bgcolor=#fefefe
| 450476 ||  || — || December 1, 2005 || Kitt Peak || Spacewatch || — || align=right data-sort-value="0.64" | 640 m || 
|-id=477 bgcolor=#fefefe
| 450477 ||  || — || December 1, 2005 || Kitt Peak || Spacewatch || — || align=right data-sort-value="0.77" | 770 m || 
|-id=478 bgcolor=#d6d6d6
| 450478 ||  || — || December 2, 2005 || Mount Lemmon || Mount Lemmon Survey || EOS || align=right | 2.0 km || 
|-id=479 bgcolor=#d6d6d6
| 450479 ||  || — || October 29, 2005 || Mount Lemmon || Mount Lemmon Survey || — || align=right | 2.9 km || 
|-id=480 bgcolor=#d6d6d6
| 450480 ||  || — || December 2, 2005 || Kitt Peak || Spacewatch || — || align=right | 2.9 km || 
|-id=481 bgcolor=#fefefe
| 450481 ||  || — || December 4, 2005 || Kitt Peak || Spacewatch || — || align=right data-sort-value="0.64" | 640 m || 
|-id=482 bgcolor=#d6d6d6
| 450482 ||  || — || December 6, 2005 || Kitt Peak || Spacewatch || — || align=right | 3.6 km || 
|-id=483 bgcolor=#fefefe
| 450483 ||  || — || December 22, 2005 || Kitt Peak || Spacewatch || — || align=right data-sort-value="0.68" | 680 m || 
|-id=484 bgcolor=#fefefe
| 450484 ||  || — || December 22, 2005 || Kitt Peak || Spacewatch || — || align=right data-sort-value="0.56" | 560 m || 
|-id=485 bgcolor=#d6d6d6
| 450485 ||  || — || December 24, 2005 || Kitt Peak || Spacewatch || — || align=right | 2.6 km || 
|-id=486 bgcolor=#d6d6d6
| 450486 ||  || — || December 24, 2005 || Kitt Peak || Spacewatch || THM || align=right | 1.7 km || 
|-id=487 bgcolor=#d6d6d6
| 450487 ||  || — || December 24, 2005 || Kitt Peak || Spacewatch || — || align=right | 3.0 km || 
|-id=488 bgcolor=#fefefe
| 450488 ||  || — || December 26, 2005 || Kitt Peak || Spacewatch || — || align=right data-sort-value="0.68" | 680 m || 
|-id=489 bgcolor=#fefefe
| 450489 ||  || — || December 27, 2005 || Kitt Peak || Spacewatch || — || align=right data-sort-value="0.68" | 680 m || 
|-id=490 bgcolor=#d6d6d6
| 450490 ||  || — || November 1, 2005 || Mount Lemmon || Mount Lemmon Survey || EOS || align=right | 1.9 km || 
|-id=491 bgcolor=#d6d6d6
| 450491 ||  || — || December 4, 2005 || Mount Lemmon || Mount Lemmon Survey || — || align=right | 2.0 km || 
|-id=492 bgcolor=#fefefe
| 450492 ||  || — || December 25, 2005 || Kitt Peak || Spacewatch || — || align=right data-sort-value="0.58" | 580 m || 
|-id=493 bgcolor=#fefefe
| 450493 ||  || — || December 26, 2005 || Kitt Peak || Spacewatch || — || align=right data-sort-value="0.54" | 540 m || 
|-id=494 bgcolor=#d6d6d6
| 450494 ||  || — || December 25, 2005 || Mount Lemmon || Mount Lemmon Survey || EMA || align=right | 3.0 km || 
|-id=495 bgcolor=#d6d6d6
| 450495 ||  || — || December 28, 2005 || Mount Lemmon || Mount Lemmon Survey || — || align=right | 2.0 km || 
|-id=496 bgcolor=#d6d6d6
| 450496 ||  || — || December 28, 2005 || Mount Lemmon || Mount Lemmon Survey || EOS || align=right | 2.8 km || 
|-id=497 bgcolor=#d6d6d6
| 450497 ||  || — || November 30, 2005 || Mount Lemmon || Mount Lemmon Survey || EMA || align=right | 3.2 km || 
|-id=498 bgcolor=#fefefe
| 450498 ||  || — || December 22, 2005 || Kitt Peak || Spacewatch || V || align=right data-sort-value="0.69" | 690 m || 
|-id=499 bgcolor=#fefefe
| 450499 ||  || — || December 28, 2005 || Mount Lemmon || Mount Lemmon Survey || — || align=right | 1.00 km || 
|-id=500 bgcolor=#d6d6d6
| 450500 ||  || — || December 30, 2005 || Kitt Peak || Spacewatch || — || align=right | 3.4 km || 
|}

450501–450600 

|-bgcolor=#C2FFFF
| 450501 ||  || — || December 25, 2005 || Mount Lemmon || Mount Lemmon Survey || L5 || align=right | 12 km || 
|-id=502 bgcolor=#fefefe
| 450502 ||  || — || December 29, 2005 || Kitt Peak || Spacewatch || — || align=right data-sort-value="0.74" | 740 m || 
|-id=503 bgcolor=#fefefe
| 450503 ||  || — || December 29, 2005 || Kitt Peak || Spacewatch || — || align=right data-sort-value="0.52" | 520 m || 
|-id=504 bgcolor=#d6d6d6
| 450504 ||  || — || December 25, 2005 || Kitt Peak || Spacewatch || EOS || align=right | 1.5 km || 
|-id=505 bgcolor=#d6d6d6
| 450505 ||  || — || December 25, 2005 || Mount Lemmon || Mount Lemmon Survey || — || align=right | 3.3 km || 
|-id=506 bgcolor=#d6d6d6
| 450506 ||  || — || December 26, 2005 || Mount Lemmon || Mount Lemmon Survey || — || align=right | 2.4 km || 
|-id=507 bgcolor=#d6d6d6
| 450507 ||  || — || December 28, 2005 || Kitt Peak || Spacewatch || — || align=right | 2.4 km || 
|-id=508 bgcolor=#fefefe
| 450508 ||  || — || January 5, 2006 || Kitt Peak || Spacewatch || — || align=right data-sort-value="0.79" | 790 m || 
|-id=509 bgcolor=#fefefe
| 450509 ||  || — || January 4, 2006 || Mount Lemmon || Mount Lemmon Survey || H || align=right data-sort-value="0.83" | 830 m || 
|-id=510 bgcolor=#fefefe
| 450510 ||  || — || January 5, 2006 || Mount Lemmon || Mount Lemmon Survey || H || align=right data-sort-value="0.95" | 950 m || 
|-id=511 bgcolor=#d6d6d6
| 450511 ||  || — || December 26, 2005 || Mount Lemmon || Mount Lemmon Survey || — || align=right | 2.5 km || 
|-id=512 bgcolor=#d6d6d6
| 450512 ||  || — || December 10, 2005 || Kitt Peak || Spacewatch || EOS || align=right | 1.8 km || 
|-id=513 bgcolor=#d6d6d6
| 450513 ||  || — || December 30, 2005 || Kitt Peak || Spacewatch || — || align=right | 1.8 km || 
|-id=514 bgcolor=#fefefe
| 450514 ||  || — || January 5, 2006 || Kitt Peak || Spacewatch || — || align=right data-sort-value="0.46" | 460 m || 
|-id=515 bgcolor=#d6d6d6
| 450515 ||  || — || December 2, 2005 || Mount Lemmon || Mount Lemmon Survey || EOS || align=right | 1.9 km || 
|-id=516 bgcolor=#d6d6d6
| 450516 ||  || — || January 5, 2006 || Mount Lemmon || Mount Lemmon Survey || — || align=right | 2.5 km || 
|-id=517 bgcolor=#fefefe
| 450517 ||  || — || January 7, 2006 || Mount Lemmon || Mount Lemmon Survey || — || align=right data-sort-value="0.67" | 670 m || 
|-id=518 bgcolor=#d6d6d6
| 450518 ||  || — || January 6, 2006 || Mount Lemmon || Mount Lemmon Survey || — || align=right | 2.3 km || 
|-id=519 bgcolor=#d6d6d6
| 450519 ||  || — || January 7, 2006 || Mount Lemmon || Mount Lemmon Survey || — || align=right | 2.5 km || 
|-id=520 bgcolor=#d6d6d6
| 450520 ||  || — || December 25, 2005 || Kitt Peak || Spacewatch || EOS || align=right | 2.0 km || 
|-id=521 bgcolor=#fefefe
| 450521 ||  || — || January 23, 2006 || Kitt Peak || Spacewatch || — || align=right | 1.00 km || 
|-id=522 bgcolor=#d6d6d6
| 450522 ||  || — || January 23, 2006 || Kitt Peak || Spacewatch || THM || align=right | 2.4 km || 
|-id=523 bgcolor=#fefefe
| 450523 ||  || — || January 23, 2006 || Kitt Peak || Spacewatch || — || align=right data-sort-value="0.46" | 460 m || 
|-id=524 bgcolor=#d6d6d6
| 450524 ||  || — || January 23, 2006 || Kitt Peak || Spacewatch || — || align=right | 3.5 km || 
|-id=525 bgcolor=#fefefe
| 450525 ||  || — || January 23, 2006 || Kitt Peak || Spacewatch || — || align=right data-sort-value="0.76" | 760 m || 
|-id=526 bgcolor=#d6d6d6
| 450526 ||  || — || January 23, 2006 || Kitt Peak || Spacewatch || EMA || align=right | 3.0 km || 
|-id=527 bgcolor=#fefefe
| 450527 ||  || — || January 23, 2006 || Kitt Peak || Spacewatch || — || align=right data-sort-value="0.67" | 670 m || 
|-id=528 bgcolor=#d6d6d6
| 450528 ||  || — || December 28, 2005 || Mount Lemmon || Mount Lemmon Survey || — || align=right | 2.1 km || 
|-id=529 bgcolor=#d6d6d6
| 450529 ||  || — || January 25, 2006 || Kitt Peak || Spacewatch || — || align=right | 2.7 km || 
|-id=530 bgcolor=#fefefe
| 450530 ||  || — || January 25, 2006 || Kitt Peak || Spacewatch || — || align=right data-sort-value="0.72" | 720 m || 
|-id=531 bgcolor=#fefefe
| 450531 ||  || — || January 25, 2006 || Kitt Peak || Spacewatch || — || align=right data-sort-value="0.46" | 460 m || 
|-id=532 bgcolor=#d6d6d6
| 450532 ||  || — || January 21, 2006 || Kitt Peak || Spacewatch || — || align=right | 2.8 km || 
|-id=533 bgcolor=#fefefe
| 450533 ||  || — || January 26, 2006 || Mount Lemmon || Mount Lemmon Survey || — || align=right data-sort-value="0.59" | 590 m || 
|-id=534 bgcolor=#d6d6d6
| 450534 ||  || — || January 7, 2006 || Mount Lemmon || Mount Lemmon Survey || — || align=right | 3.1 km || 
|-id=535 bgcolor=#d6d6d6
| 450535 ||  || — || January 7, 2006 || Mount Lemmon || Mount Lemmon Survey || — || align=right | 3.0 km || 
|-id=536 bgcolor=#fefefe
| 450536 ||  || — || January 26, 2006 || Mount Lemmon || Mount Lemmon Survey || — || align=right data-sort-value="0.75" | 750 m || 
|-id=537 bgcolor=#d6d6d6
| 450537 ||  || — || January 26, 2006 || Mount Lemmon || Mount Lemmon Survey || — || align=right | 2.4 km || 
|-id=538 bgcolor=#d6d6d6
| 450538 ||  || — || January 30, 2006 || Kitt Peak || Spacewatch || — || align=right | 3.0 km || 
|-id=539 bgcolor=#d6d6d6
| 450539 ||  || — || January 31, 2006 || Kitt Peak || Spacewatch || — || align=right | 2.7 km || 
|-id=540 bgcolor=#fefefe
| 450540 ||  || — || January 23, 2006 || Kitt Peak || Spacewatch || — || align=right data-sort-value="0.60" | 600 m || 
|-id=541 bgcolor=#fefefe
| 450541 ||  || — || January 31, 2006 || Kitt Peak || Spacewatch || NYS || align=right data-sort-value="0.50" | 500 m || 
|-id=542 bgcolor=#d6d6d6
| 450542 ||  || — || January 23, 2006 || Kitt Peak || Spacewatch || — || align=right | 3.5 km || 
|-id=543 bgcolor=#fefefe
| 450543 ||  || — || January 30, 2006 || Kitt Peak || Spacewatch || — || align=right data-sort-value="0.67" | 670 m || 
|-id=544 bgcolor=#d6d6d6
| 450544 ||  || — || January 27, 2006 || Kitt Peak || Spacewatch || — || align=right | 2.4 km || 
|-id=545 bgcolor=#d6d6d6
| 450545 ||  || — || February 4, 2006 || Catalina || CSS || — || align=right | 3.6 km || 
|-id=546 bgcolor=#d6d6d6
| 450546 ||  || — || February 20, 2006 || Kitt Peak || Spacewatch || — || align=right | 2.5 km || 
|-id=547 bgcolor=#FA8072
| 450547 ||  || — || February 22, 2006 || Catalina || CSS || H || align=right data-sort-value="0.93" | 930 m || 
|-id=548 bgcolor=#d6d6d6
| 450548 ||  || — || February 1, 2006 || Catalina || CSS || — || align=right | 4.0 km || 
|-id=549 bgcolor=#fefefe
| 450549 ||  || — || February 25, 2006 || Kitt Peak || Spacewatch || NYS || align=right data-sort-value="0.44" | 440 m || 
|-id=550 bgcolor=#fefefe
| 450550 ||  || — || February 25, 2006 || Kitt Peak || Spacewatch || — || align=right data-sort-value="0.72" | 720 m || 
|-id=551 bgcolor=#d6d6d6
| 450551 ||  || — || February 25, 2006 || Mount Lemmon || Mount Lemmon Survey || Tj (2.99) || align=right | 3.4 km || 
|-id=552 bgcolor=#fefefe
| 450552 ||  || — || February 25, 2006 || Kitt Peak || Spacewatch || — || align=right data-sort-value="0.86" | 860 m || 
|-id=553 bgcolor=#fefefe
| 450553 ||  || — || February 25, 2006 || Kitt Peak || Spacewatch || — || align=right data-sort-value="0.80" | 800 m || 
|-id=554 bgcolor=#fefefe
| 450554 ||  || — || February 25, 2006 || Kitt Peak || Spacewatch || NYS || align=right data-sort-value="0.57" | 570 m || 
|-id=555 bgcolor=#d6d6d6
| 450555 ||  || — || February 27, 2006 || Kitt Peak || Spacewatch || VER || align=right | 2.5 km || 
|-id=556 bgcolor=#d6d6d6
| 450556 ||  || — || February 24, 2006 || Kitt Peak || Spacewatch || — || align=right | 2.9 km || 
|-id=557 bgcolor=#d6d6d6
| 450557 ||  || — || January 26, 2006 || Kitt Peak || Spacewatch || THM || align=right | 2.2 km || 
|-id=558 bgcolor=#fefefe
| 450558 ||  || — || March 4, 2006 || Kitt Peak || Spacewatch || — || align=right data-sort-value="0.71" | 710 m || 
|-id=559 bgcolor=#d6d6d6
| 450559 ||  || — || March 4, 2006 || Kitt Peak || Spacewatch || — || align=right | 3.0 km || 
|-id=560 bgcolor=#fefefe
| 450560 ||  || — || March 23, 2006 || Kitt Peak || Spacewatch || — || align=right | 1.1 km || 
|-id=561 bgcolor=#fefefe
| 450561 ||  || — || March 2, 2006 || Kitt Peak || Spacewatch || — || align=right data-sort-value="0.78" | 780 m || 
|-id=562 bgcolor=#fefefe
| 450562 ||  || — || March 24, 2006 || Mount Lemmon || Mount Lemmon Survey || — || align=right data-sort-value="0.71" | 710 m || 
|-id=563 bgcolor=#FA8072
| 450563 ||  || — || March 19, 2006 || Siding Spring || SSS || — || align=right | 1.1 km || 
|-id=564 bgcolor=#d6d6d6
| 450564 ||  || — || March 3, 2006 || Catalina || CSS || — || align=right | 3.1 km || 
|-id=565 bgcolor=#d6d6d6
| 450565 ||  || — || March 26, 2006 || Siding Spring || SSS || Tj (2.96) || align=right | 3.0 km || 
|-id=566 bgcolor=#d6d6d6
| 450566 ||  || — || March 25, 2006 || Catalina || CSS || — || align=right | 3.7 km || 
|-id=567 bgcolor=#fefefe
| 450567 ||  || — || March 24, 2006 || Kitt Peak || Spacewatch || — || align=right data-sort-value="0.78" | 780 m || 
|-id=568 bgcolor=#fefefe
| 450568 ||  || — || April 2, 2006 || Kitt Peak || Spacewatch || — || align=right data-sort-value="0.84" | 840 m || 
|-id=569 bgcolor=#fefefe
| 450569 ||  || — || April 18, 2006 || Kitt Peak || Spacewatch || — || align=right data-sort-value="0.81" | 810 m || 
|-id=570 bgcolor=#d6d6d6
| 450570 ||  || — || April 19, 2006 || Socorro || LINEAR || — || align=right | 4.3 km || 
|-id=571 bgcolor=#E9E9E9
| 450571 ||  || — || April 26, 2006 || Kitt Peak || Spacewatch || — || align=right data-sort-value="0.98" | 980 m || 
|-id=572 bgcolor=#fefefe
| 450572 ||  || — || May 8, 2006 || Kitt Peak || Spacewatch || — || align=right | 1.0 km || 
|-id=573 bgcolor=#E9E9E9
| 450573 ||  || — || June 19, 2006 || Mount Lemmon || Mount Lemmon Survey || JUN || align=right data-sort-value="0.96" | 960 m || 
|-id=574 bgcolor=#E9E9E9
| 450574 ||  || — || July 29, 2006 || Marly || Naef Obs. || — || align=right | 1.1 km || 
|-id=575 bgcolor=#E9E9E9
| 450575 ||  || — || August 12, 2006 || Palomar || NEAT || — || align=right | 1.3 km || 
|-id=576 bgcolor=#E9E9E9
| 450576 ||  || — || August 12, 2006 || Palomar || NEAT || ADE || align=right | 1.8 km || 
|-id=577 bgcolor=#E9E9E9
| 450577 ||  || — || August 13, 2006 || Palomar || NEAT || — || align=right | 1.5 km || 
|-id=578 bgcolor=#E9E9E9
| 450578 ||  || — || June 19, 2006 || Mount Lemmon || Mount Lemmon Survey || — || align=right | 1.4 km || 
|-id=579 bgcolor=#E9E9E9
| 450579 ||  || — || August 19, 2006 || Anderson Mesa || LONEOS || — || align=right | 1.1 km || 
|-id=580 bgcolor=#E9E9E9
| 450580 ||  || — || August 18, 2006 || Anderson Mesa || LONEOS || — || align=right | 2.6 km || 
|-id=581 bgcolor=#E9E9E9
| 450581 ||  || — || August 22, 2006 || Palomar || NEAT || — || align=right | 1.4 km || 
|-id=582 bgcolor=#E9E9E9
| 450582 ||  || — || August 16, 2006 || Palomar || NEAT || — || align=right | 1.3 km || 
|-id=583 bgcolor=#E9E9E9
| 450583 ||  || — || August 26, 2006 || Siding Spring || SSS || — || align=right | 1.4 km || 
|-id=584 bgcolor=#E9E9E9
| 450584 ||  || — || August 28, 2006 || Kitt Peak || Spacewatch || — || align=right | 1.2 km || 
|-id=585 bgcolor=#E9E9E9
| 450585 ||  || — || August 19, 2006 || Kitt Peak || Spacewatch || — || align=right | 1.2 km || 
|-id=586 bgcolor=#E9E9E9
| 450586 ||  || — || August 24, 2006 || Socorro || LINEAR || — || align=right | 1.5 km || 
|-id=587 bgcolor=#E9E9E9
| 450587 ||  || — || August 19, 2006 || Kitt Peak || Spacewatch || — || align=right | 1.6 km || 
|-id=588 bgcolor=#E9E9E9
| 450588 ||  || — || September 14, 2006 || Catalina || CSS || — || align=right | 1.8 km || 
|-id=589 bgcolor=#E9E9E9
| 450589 ||  || — || September 15, 2006 || Kitt Peak || Spacewatch || EUN || align=right | 1.2 km || 
|-id=590 bgcolor=#E9E9E9
| 450590 ||  || — || August 28, 2006 || Catalina || CSS || — || align=right | 1.5 km || 
|-id=591 bgcolor=#E9E9E9
| 450591 ||  || — || September 14, 2006 || Kitt Peak || Spacewatch || — || align=right | 1.2 km || 
|-id=592 bgcolor=#E9E9E9
| 450592 ||  || — || September 14, 2006 || Kitt Peak || Spacewatch || — || align=right | 1.8 km || 
|-id=593 bgcolor=#E9E9E9
| 450593 ||  || — || September 14, 2006 || Kitt Peak || Spacewatch || — || align=right | 1.4 km || 
|-id=594 bgcolor=#E9E9E9
| 450594 ||  || — || September 15, 2006 || Kitt Peak || Spacewatch || — || align=right | 2.3 km || 
|-id=595 bgcolor=#E9E9E9
| 450595 ||  || — || September 15, 2006 || Kitt Peak || Spacewatch || NEM || align=right | 2.0 km || 
|-id=596 bgcolor=#E9E9E9
| 450596 ||  || — || September 15, 2006 || Kitt Peak || Spacewatch || — || align=right | 1.9 km || 
|-id=597 bgcolor=#E9E9E9
| 450597 ||  || — || September 15, 2006 || Kitt Peak || Spacewatch || — || align=right | 1.4 km || 
|-id=598 bgcolor=#E9E9E9
| 450598 ||  || — || September 15, 2006 || Kitt Peak || Spacewatch || — || align=right | 1.5 km || 
|-id=599 bgcolor=#E9E9E9
| 450599 ||  || — || June 21, 2006 || Catalina || CSS || — || align=right | 1.7 km || 
|-id=600 bgcolor=#E9E9E9
| 450600 ||  || — || September 16, 2006 || Catalina || CSS || — || align=right | 2.5 km || 
|}

450601–450700 

|-bgcolor=#E9E9E9
| 450601 ||  || — || September 17, 2006 || Kitt Peak || Spacewatch || — || align=right | 1.5 km || 
|-id=602 bgcolor=#E9E9E9
| 450602 ||  || — || September 19, 2006 || Kitt Peak || Spacewatch || — || align=right | 2.5 km || 
|-id=603 bgcolor=#E9E9E9
| 450603 ||  || — || September 18, 2006 || Kitt Peak || Spacewatch || — || align=right | 2.0 km || 
|-id=604 bgcolor=#E9E9E9
| 450604 ||  || — || September 19, 2006 || Kitt Peak || Spacewatch || EUN || align=right | 1.0 km || 
|-id=605 bgcolor=#E9E9E9
| 450605 ||  || — || September 19, 2006 || Kitt Peak || Spacewatch || — || align=right | 1.1 km || 
|-id=606 bgcolor=#E9E9E9
| 450606 ||  || — || September 19, 2006 || Catalina || CSS || — || align=right | 2.8 km || 
|-id=607 bgcolor=#E9E9E9
| 450607 ||  || — || September 26, 2006 || Kitt Peak || Spacewatch || JUN || align=right data-sort-value="0.80" | 800 m || 
|-id=608 bgcolor=#E9E9E9
| 450608 ||  || — || September 26, 2006 || Mount Lemmon || Mount Lemmon Survey || — || align=right | 1.4 km || 
|-id=609 bgcolor=#E9E9E9
| 450609 ||  || — || September 26, 2006 || Kitt Peak || Spacewatch || — || align=right | 1.6 km || 
|-id=610 bgcolor=#E9E9E9
| 450610 ||  || — || September 26, 2006 || Mount Lemmon || Mount Lemmon Survey || — || align=right | 2.5 km || 
|-id=611 bgcolor=#E9E9E9
| 450611 ||  || — || September 15, 2006 || Kitt Peak || Spacewatch || — || align=right | 1.4 km || 
|-id=612 bgcolor=#E9E9E9
| 450612 ||  || — || August 29, 2006 || Kitt Peak || Spacewatch || — || align=right | 1.6 km || 
|-id=613 bgcolor=#E9E9E9
| 450613 ||  || — || September 30, 2006 || Kitt Peak || Spacewatch || — || align=right | 1.6 km || 
|-id=614 bgcolor=#E9E9E9
| 450614 ||  || — || September 27, 2006 || Kitt Peak || Spacewatch || — || align=right | 1.7 km || 
|-id=615 bgcolor=#E9E9E9
| 450615 ||  || — || September 27, 2006 || Kitt Peak || Spacewatch || — || align=right | 1.5 km || 
|-id=616 bgcolor=#E9E9E9
| 450616 ||  || — || September 30, 2006 || Mount Lemmon || Mount Lemmon Survey || — || align=right | 2.2 km || 
|-id=617 bgcolor=#E9E9E9
| 450617 ||  || — || September 28, 2006 || Apache Point || A. C. Becker || — || align=right | 1.5 km || 
|-id=618 bgcolor=#E9E9E9
| 450618 ||  || — || September 29, 2006 || Apache Point || A. C. Becker || — || align=right | 1.8 km || 
|-id=619 bgcolor=#E9E9E9
| 450619 ||  || — || September 30, 2006 || Apache Point || A. C. Becker || EUN || align=right | 1.1 km || 
|-id=620 bgcolor=#E9E9E9
| 450620 ||  || — || September 25, 2006 || Kitt Peak || Spacewatch || — || align=right | 1.7 km || 
|-id=621 bgcolor=#E9E9E9
| 450621 ||  || — || September 17, 2006 || Kitt Peak || Spacewatch || — || align=right | 2.0 km || 
|-id=622 bgcolor=#E9E9E9
| 450622 ||  || — || September 27, 2006 || Mount Lemmon || Mount Lemmon Survey || — || align=right | 2.0 km || 
|-id=623 bgcolor=#E9E9E9
| 450623 ||  || — || September 17, 2006 || Catalina || CSS || EUN || align=right | 1.1 km || 
|-id=624 bgcolor=#E9E9E9
| 450624 ||  || — || September 26, 2006 || Kitt Peak || Spacewatch || — || align=right | 1.2 km || 
|-id=625 bgcolor=#E9E9E9
| 450625 ||  || — || October 10, 2006 || Palomar || NEAT || — || align=right | 2.1 km || 
|-id=626 bgcolor=#E9E9E9
| 450626 ||  || — || October 11, 2006 || Kitt Peak || Spacewatch || — || align=right | 2.1 km || 
|-id=627 bgcolor=#E9E9E9
| 450627 ||  || — || October 12, 2006 || Kitt Peak || Spacewatch || — || align=right | 1.5 km || 
|-id=628 bgcolor=#E9E9E9
| 450628 ||  || — || October 12, 2006 || Palomar || NEAT || — || align=right | 1.8 km || 
|-id=629 bgcolor=#E9E9E9
| 450629 ||  || — || September 29, 2006 || Anderson Mesa || LONEOS || — || align=right | 1.5 km || 
|-id=630 bgcolor=#E9E9E9
| 450630 ||  || — || October 13, 2006 || Kitt Peak || Spacewatch || HOF || align=right | 2.3 km || 
|-id=631 bgcolor=#E9E9E9
| 450631 ||  || — || September 28, 2006 || Catalina || CSS || Tj (2.96) || align=right | 2.3 km || 
|-id=632 bgcolor=#E9E9E9
| 450632 ||  || — || October 15, 2006 || Kitt Peak || Spacewatch || — || align=right | 1.7 km || 
|-id=633 bgcolor=#E9E9E9
| 450633 ||  || — || October 13, 2006 || Kitt Peak || Spacewatch || — || align=right | 1.7 km || 
|-id=634 bgcolor=#E9E9E9
| 450634 ||  || — || October 13, 2006 || Kitt Peak || Spacewatch || — || align=right | 1.8 km || 
|-id=635 bgcolor=#E9E9E9
| 450635 ||  || — || October 2, 2006 || Mount Lemmon || Mount Lemmon Survey || — || align=right | 1.6 km || 
|-id=636 bgcolor=#E9E9E9
| 450636 ||  || — || October 4, 2006 || Mount Lemmon || Mount Lemmon Survey || — || align=right | 1.9 km || 
|-id=637 bgcolor=#E9E9E9
| 450637 ||  || — || September 30, 2006 || Mount Lemmon || Mount Lemmon Survey || — || align=right | 1.8 km || 
|-id=638 bgcolor=#E9E9E9
| 450638 ||  || — || October 16, 2006 || Catalina || CSS || — || align=right | 2.5 km || 
|-id=639 bgcolor=#E9E9E9
| 450639 ||  || — || October 16, 2006 || Catalina || CSS || JUN || align=right | 1.0 km || 
|-id=640 bgcolor=#E9E9E9
| 450640 ||  || — || September 25, 2006 || Kitt Peak || Spacewatch || — || align=right | 1.6 km || 
|-id=641 bgcolor=#E9E9E9
| 450641 ||  || — || September 25, 2006 || Kitt Peak || Spacewatch || — || align=right | 1.2 km || 
|-id=642 bgcolor=#E9E9E9
| 450642 ||  || — || October 16, 2006 || Mount Lemmon || Mount Lemmon Survey || — || align=right | 1.5 km || 
|-id=643 bgcolor=#E9E9E9
| 450643 ||  || — || October 16, 2006 || Kitt Peak || Spacewatch || — || align=right | 1.8 km || 
|-id=644 bgcolor=#E9E9E9
| 450644 ||  || — || October 16, 2006 || Kitt Peak || Spacewatch || — || align=right | 1.3 km || 
|-id=645 bgcolor=#E9E9E9
| 450645 ||  || — || October 16, 2006 || Kitt Peak || Spacewatch || — || align=right | 2.0 km || 
|-id=646 bgcolor=#E9E9E9
| 450646 ||  || — || September 30, 2006 || Mount Lemmon || Mount Lemmon Survey || EUN || align=right | 1.4 km || 
|-id=647 bgcolor=#E9E9E9
| 450647 ||  || — || October 19, 2006 || Catalina || CSS || JUN || align=right | 3.5 km || 
|-id=648 bgcolor=#FFC2E0
| 450648 ||  || — || October 21, 2006 || Kitt Peak || Spacewatch || AMO || align=right data-sort-value="0.43" | 430 m || 
|-id=649 bgcolor=#FFC2E0
| 450649 ||  || — || October 25, 2006 || Siding Spring || SSS || ATEcritical || align=right data-sort-value="0.45" | 450 m || 
|-id=650 bgcolor=#E9E9E9
| 450650 ||  || — || October 17, 2006 || Kitt Peak || Spacewatch || — || align=right | 1.8 km || 
|-id=651 bgcolor=#E9E9E9
| 450651 ||  || — || October 18, 2006 || Kitt Peak || Spacewatch || — || align=right | 1.8 km || 
|-id=652 bgcolor=#E9E9E9
| 450652 ||  || — || October 3, 2006 || Mount Lemmon || Mount Lemmon Survey || — || align=right | 2.0 km || 
|-id=653 bgcolor=#E9E9E9
| 450653 ||  || — || September 30, 2006 || Mount Lemmon || Mount Lemmon Survey || — || align=right | 1.8 km || 
|-id=654 bgcolor=#E9E9E9
| 450654 ||  || — || October 19, 2006 || Kitt Peak || Spacewatch || JUN || align=right | 1.0 km || 
|-id=655 bgcolor=#E9E9E9
| 450655 ||  || — || October 19, 2006 || Kitt Peak || Spacewatch || — || align=right | 2.5 km || 
|-id=656 bgcolor=#E9E9E9
| 450656 ||  || — || October 16, 2006 || Catalina || CSS || — || align=right | 1.6 km || 
|-id=657 bgcolor=#E9E9E9
| 450657 ||  || — || September 17, 2006 || Catalina || CSS || — || align=right | 2.3 km || 
|-id=658 bgcolor=#E9E9E9
| 450658 ||  || — || October 20, 2006 || Kitt Peak || Spacewatch || — || align=right | 1.7 km || 
|-id=659 bgcolor=#E9E9E9
| 450659 ||  || — || October 2, 2006 || Mount Lemmon || Mount Lemmon Survey || — || align=right | 2.5 km || 
|-id=660 bgcolor=#E9E9E9
| 450660 ||  || — || October 23, 2006 || Kitt Peak || Spacewatch || — || align=right | 1.5 km || 
|-id=661 bgcolor=#E9E9E9
| 450661 ||  || — || October 23, 2006 || Kitt Peak || Spacewatch || — || align=right | 2.2 km || 
|-id=662 bgcolor=#E9E9E9
| 450662 ||  || — || October 23, 2006 || Kitt Peak || Spacewatch || — || align=right | 1.7 km || 
|-id=663 bgcolor=#E9E9E9
| 450663 ||  || — || September 26, 2006 || Mount Lemmon || Mount Lemmon Survey || — || align=right | 1.3 km || 
|-id=664 bgcolor=#E9E9E9
| 450664 ||  || — || October 23, 2006 || Kitt Peak || Spacewatch || — || align=right | 2.5 km || 
|-id=665 bgcolor=#E9E9E9
| 450665 ||  || — || September 18, 2006 || Kitt Peak || Spacewatch || — || align=right | 1.3 km || 
|-id=666 bgcolor=#E9E9E9
| 450666 ||  || — || September 30, 2006 || Kitt Peak || Spacewatch || — || align=right | 1.4 km || 
|-id=667 bgcolor=#E9E9E9
| 450667 ||  || — || October 27, 2006 || Catalina || CSS || — || align=right | 2.0 km || 
|-id=668 bgcolor=#E9E9E9
| 450668 ||  || — || October 27, 2006 || Mount Lemmon || Mount Lemmon Survey || AST || align=right | 1.5 km || 
|-id=669 bgcolor=#E9E9E9
| 450669 ||  || — || October 27, 2006 || Kitt Peak || Spacewatch || HOF || align=right | 2.5 km || 
|-id=670 bgcolor=#E9E9E9
| 450670 ||  || — || October 22, 2006 || Kitt Peak || Spacewatch || — || align=right | 2.9 km || 
|-id=671 bgcolor=#E9E9E9
| 450671 ||  || — || October 17, 2006 || Catalina || CSS || — || align=right | 2.3 km || 
|-id=672 bgcolor=#E9E9E9
| 450672 ||  || — || November 10, 2006 || Kitt Peak || Spacewatch || — || align=right | 1.8 km || 
|-id=673 bgcolor=#E9E9E9
| 450673 ||  || — || November 10, 2006 || Kitt Peak || Spacewatch || — || align=right | 2.2 km || 
|-id=674 bgcolor=#E9E9E9
| 450674 ||  || — || November 9, 2006 || Kitt Peak || Spacewatch || — || align=right | 2.3 km || 
|-id=675 bgcolor=#E9E9E9
| 450675 ||  || — || November 9, 2006 || Kitt Peak || Spacewatch || — || align=right | 2.3 km || 
|-id=676 bgcolor=#E9E9E9
| 450676 ||  || — || November 11, 2006 || Mount Lemmon || Mount Lemmon Survey || — || align=right | 1.8 km || 
|-id=677 bgcolor=#E9E9E9
| 450677 ||  || — || October 20, 2006 || Kitt Peak || Spacewatch || — || align=right | 2.1 km || 
|-id=678 bgcolor=#E9E9E9
| 450678 ||  || — || October 27, 2006 || Mount Lemmon || Mount Lemmon Survey || — || align=right | 2.0 km || 
|-id=679 bgcolor=#E9E9E9
| 450679 ||  || — || November 11, 2006 || Kitt Peak || Spacewatch || — || align=right | 1.8 km || 
|-id=680 bgcolor=#E9E9E9
| 450680 ||  || — || November 11, 2006 || Kitt Peak || Spacewatch || — || align=right | 2.1 km || 
|-id=681 bgcolor=#E9E9E9
| 450681 ||  || — || November 11, 2006 || Kitt Peak || Spacewatch || — || align=right | 2.3 km || 
|-id=682 bgcolor=#E9E9E9
| 450682 ||  || — || November 11, 2006 || Kitt Peak || Spacewatch || — || align=right | 1.7 km || 
|-id=683 bgcolor=#E9E9E9
| 450683 ||  || — || November 15, 2006 || Kitt Peak || Spacewatch || NEM || align=right | 1.9 km || 
|-id=684 bgcolor=#E9E9E9
| 450684 ||  || — || November 10, 2006 || Kitt Peak || Spacewatch || — || align=right | 2.8 km || 
|-id=685 bgcolor=#E9E9E9
| 450685 ||  || — || October 18, 2006 || Kitt Peak || Spacewatch || AEO || align=right | 1.1 km || 
|-id=686 bgcolor=#E9E9E9
| 450686 ||  || — || November 14, 2006 || Kitt Peak || Spacewatch || — || align=right | 2.8 km || 
|-id=687 bgcolor=#E9E9E9
| 450687 ||  || — || November 15, 2006 || Kitt Peak || Spacewatch || AGN || align=right | 1.0 km || 
|-id=688 bgcolor=#E9E9E9
| 450688 ||  || — || November 15, 2006 || Kitt Peak || Spacewatch || AST || align=right | 1.4 km || 
|-id=689 bgcolor=#E9E9E9
| 450689 || 2006 WO || — || November 16, 2006 || Jornada || D. S. Dixon || — || align=right | 2.1 km || 
|-id=690 bgcolor=#E9E9E9
| 450690 || 2006 WP || — || November 17, 2006 || Jarnac || Jarnac Obs. || — || align=right | 2.4 km || 
|-id=691 bgcolor=#E9E9E9
| 450691 ||  || — || November 16, 2006 || Mount Lemmon || Mount Lemmon Survey || — || align=right | 2.7 km || 
|-id=692 bgcolor=#E9E9E9
| 450692 ||  || — || November 2, 2006 || Catalina || CSS || — || align=right | 2.4 km || 
|-id=693 bgcolor=#E9E9E9
| 450693 ||  || — || October 20, 2006 || Mount Lemmon || Mount Lemmon Survey || AGN || align=right | 1.2 km || 
|-id=694 bgcolor=#E9E9E9
| 450694 ||  || — || September 28, 2006 || Mount Lemmon || Mount Lemmon Survey || — || align=right | 2.3 km || 
|-id=695 bgcolor=#E9E9E9
| 450695 ||  || — || October 23, 2006 || Mount Lemmon || Mount Lemmon Survey || — || align=right | 2.2 km || 
|-id=696 bgcolor=#E9E9E9
| 450696 ||  || — || November 19, 2006 || Kitt Peak || Spacewatch || — || align=right | 1.8 km || 
|-id=697 bgcolor=#E9E9E9
| 450697 ||  || — || November 19, 2006 || Kitt Peak || Spacewatch || — || align=right | 1.6 km || 
|-id=698 bgcolor=#E9E9E9
| 450698 ||  || — || November 19, 2006 || Kitt Peak || Spacewatch || — || align=right | 2.0 km || 
|-id=699 bgcolor=#E9E9E9
| 450699 ||  || — || November 1, 2006 || Kitt Peak || Spacewatch || WIT || align=right data-sort-value="0.84" | 840 m || 
|-id=700 bgcolor=#E9E9E9
| 450700 ||  || — || November 20, 2006 || Kitt Peak || Spacewatch || — || align=right | 2.9 km || 
|}

450701–450800 

|-bgcolor=#E9E9E9
| 450701 ||  || — || October 22, 2006 || Mount Lemmon || Mount Lemmon Survey || — || align=right | 2.2 km || 
|-id=702 bgcolor=#E9E9E9
| 450702 ||  || — || November 23, 2006 || Kitt Peak || Spacewatch || — || align=right | 2.5 km || 
|-id=703 bgcolor=#E9E9E9
| 450703 ||  || — || November 23, 2006 || Kitt Peak || Spacewatch || — || align=right | 2.8 km || 
|-id=704 bgcolor=#E9E9E9
| 450704 ||  || — || February 23, 2003 || Campo Imperatore || CINEOS || — || align=right | 1.6 km || 
|-id=705 bgcolor=#E9E9E9
| 450705 ||  || — || November 24, 2006 || Mount Lemmon || Mount Lemmon Survey || HOF || align=right | 2.2 km || 
|-id=706 bgcolor=#E9E9E9
| 450706 ||  || — || November 16, 2006 || Kitt Peak || Spacewatch || DOR || align=right | 3.7 km || 
|-id=707 bgcolor=#E9E9E9
| 450707 ||  || — || November 18, 2006 || Kitt Peak || Spacewatch || GEF || align=right | 1.3 km || 
|-id=708 bgcolor=#E9E9E9
| 450708 ||  || — || December 12, 2006 || Kitt Peak || Spacewatch || — || align=right | 2.2 km || 
|-id=709 bgcolor=#d6d6d6
| 450709 ||  || — || December 10, 2006 || Kitt Peak || Spacewatch || BRA || align=right | 1.9 km || 
|-id=710 bgcolor=#E9E9E9
| 450710 ||  || — || December 23, 2006 || Catalina || CSS || — || align=right | 1.9 km || 
|-id=711 bgcolor=#d6d6d6
| 450711 ||  || — || January 10, 2007 || Kitt Peak || Spacewatch || — || align=right | 4.1 km || 
|-id=712 bgcolor=#E9E9E9
| 450712 ||  || — || January 17, 2007 || Palomar || NEAT || — || align=right | 2.0 km || 
|-id=713 bgcolor=#d6d6d6
| 450713 ||  || — || January 27, 2007 || Mount Lemmon || Mount Lemmon Survey || — || align=right | 3.2 km || 
|-id=714 bgcolor=#d6d6d6
| 450714 ||  || — || January 27, 2007 || Mount Lemmon || Mount Lemmon Survey || — || align=right | 2.7 km || 
|-id=715 bgcolor=#fefefe
| 450715 ||  || — || January 10, 2007 || Kitt Peak || Spacewatch || — || align=right data-sort-value="0.67" | 670 m || 
|-id=716 bgcolor=#fefefe
| 450716 ||  || — || February 17, 2007 || Kitt Peak || Spacewatch || — || align=right data-sort-value="0.62" | 620 m || 
|-id=717 bgcolor=#d6d6d6
| 450717 ||  || — || February 17, 2007 || Kitt Peak || Spacewatch || — || align=right | 2.8 km || 
|-id=718 bgcolor=#d6d6d6
| 450718 ||  || — || February 21, 2007 || Kitt Peak || Spacewatch || — || align=right | 2.1 km || 
|-id=719 bgcolor=#d6d6d6
| 450719 ||  || — || February 21, 2007 || Kitt Peak || Spacewatch || — || align=right | 2.2 km || 
|-id=720 bgcolor=#fefefe
| 450720 ||  || — || February 21, 2007 || Kitt Peak || Spacewatch || — || align=right data-sort-value="0.79" | 790 m || 
|-id=721 bgcolor=#d6d6d6
| 450721 ||  || — || February 17, 2007 || Kitt Peak || Spacewatch || EOS || align=right | 1.8 km || 
|-id=722 bgcolor=#fefefe
| 450722 ||  || — || September 14, 2005 || Kitt Peak || Spacewatch || — || align=right data-sort-value="0.69" | 690 m || 
|-id=723 bgcolor=#fefefe
| 450723 ||  || — || March 10, 2007 || Mount Lemmon || Mount Lemmon Survey || — || align=right data-sort-value="0.67" | 670 m || 
|-id=724 bgcolor=#d6d6d6
| 450724 ||  || — || March 10, 2007 || Kitt Peak || Spacewatch || — || align=right | 2.5 km || 
|-id=725 bgcolor=#d6d6d6
| 450725 ||  || — || January 28, 2007 || Mount Lemmon || Mount Lemmon Survey || — || align=right | 3.1 km || 
|-id=726 bgcolor=#fefefe
| 450726 ||  || — || March 11, 2007 || Kitt Peak || Spacewatch || — || align=right data-sort-value="0.78" | 780 m || 
|-id=727 bgcolor=#fefefe
| 450727 ||  || — || March 14, 2007 || Mount Lemmon || Mount Lemmon Survey || — || align=right data-sort-value="0.61" | 610 m || 
|-id=728 bgcolor=#d6d6d6
| 450728 ||  || — || March 9, 2007 || Kitt Peak || Spacewatch || — || align=right | 3.7 km || 
|-id=729 bgcolor=#fefefe
| 450729 ||  || — || March 16, 2007 || Kitt Peak || Spacewatch || — || align=right data-sort-value="0.77" | 770 m || 
|-id=730 bgcolor=#fefefe
| 450730 ||  || — || April 7, 2007 || Mount Lemmon || Mount Lemmon Survey || — || align=right data-sort-value="0.77" | 770 m || 
|-id=731 bgcolor=#d6d6d6
| 450731 ||  || — || April 11, 2007 || Kitt Peak || Spacewatch || — || align=right | 3.2 km || 
|-id=732 bgcolor=#fefefe
| 450732 ||  || — || April 11, 2007 || Mount Lemmon || Mount Lemmon Survey || — || align=right data-sort-value="0.62" | 620 m || 
|-id=733 bgcolor=#fefefe
| 450733 ||  || — || April 11, 2007 || Kitt Peak || Spacewatch || — || align=right data-sort-value="0.62" | 620 m || 
|-id=734 bgcolor=#d6d6d6
| 450734 ||  || — || April 14, 2007 || Kitt Peak || Spacewatch || — || align=right | 2.5 km || 
|-id=735 bgcolor=#d6d6d6
| 450735 ||  || — || April 14, 2007 || Kitt Peak || Spacewatch || — || align=right | 3.9 km || 
|-id=736 bgcolor=#d6d6d6
| 450736 ||  || — || April 14, 2007 || Kitt Peak || Spacewatch || — || align=right | 3.4 km || 
|-id=737 bgcolor=#d6d6d6
| 450737 ||  || — || April 14, 2007 || Moletai || Molėtai Obs. || — || align=right | 3.3 km || 
|-id=738 bgcolor=#d6d6d6
| 450738 ||  || — || April 15, 2007 || Kitt Peak || Spacewatch || EOS || align=right | 2.0 km || 
|-id=739 bgcolor=#d6d6d6
| 450739 ||  || — || April 15, 2007 || Kitt Peak || Spacewatch || EOS || align=right | 2.0 km || 
|-id=740 bgcolor=#fefefe
| 450740 ||  || — || April 15, 2007 || Kitt Peak || Spacewatch || — || align=right data-sort-value="0.64" | 640 m || 
|-id=741 bgcolor=#fefefe
| 450741 ||  || — || April 18, 2007 || Kitt Peak || Spacewatch || BAP || align=right data-sort-value="0.82" | 820 m || 
|-id=742 bgcolor=#d6d6d6
| 450742 ||  || — || April 19, 2007 || Kitt Peak || Spacewatch || — || align=right | 3.0 km || 
|-id=743 bgcolor=#fefefe
| 450743 ||  || — || April 20, 2007 || Mount Lemmon || Mount Lemmon Survey || — || align=right data-sort-value="0.55" | 550 m || 
|-id=744 bgcolor=#d6d6d6
| 450744 ||  || — || March 14, 2007 || Mount Lemmon || Mount Lemmon Survey || URS || align=right | 3.0 km || 
|-id=745 bgcolor=#d6d6d6
| 450745 ||  || — || April 20, 2007 || Kitt Peak || Spacewatch || — || align=right | 3.2 km || 
|-id=746 bgcolor=#d6d6d6
| 450746 ||  || — || April 22, 2007 || Kitt Peak || Spacewatch || — || align=right | 2.5 km || 
|-id=747 bgcolor=#d6d6d6
| 450747 ||  || — || April 18, 2007 || Anderson Mesa || LONEOS || — || align=right | 3.7 km || 
|-id=748 bgcolor=#fefefe
| 450748 ||  || — || April 22, 2007 || Mount Lemmon || Mount Lemmon Survey || — || align=right data-sort-value="0.94" | 940 m || 
|-id=749 bgcolor=#fefefe
| 450749 ||  || — || April 22, 2007 || Kitt Peak || Spacewatch || V || align=right data-sort-value="0.65" | 650 m || 
|-id=750 bgcolor=#fefefe
| 450750 ||  || — || April 24, 2007 || Kitt Peak || Spacewatch || — || align=right data-sort-value="0.78" | 780 m || 
|-id=751 bgcolor=#fefefe
| 450751 ||  || — || March 13, 2007 || Mount Lemmon || Mount Lemmon Survey || — || align=right data-sort-value="0.66" | 660 m || 
|-id=752 bgcolor=#fefefe
| 450752 ||  || — || April 22, 2007 || Catalina || CSS || — || align=right data-sort-value="0.98" | 980 m || 
|-id=753 bgcolor=#fefefe
| 450753 ||  || — || May 7, 2007 || Kitt Peak || Spacewatch || — || align=right data-sort-value="0.98" | 980 m || 
|-id=754 bgcolor=#d6d6d6
| 450754 ||  || — || May 10, 2007 || Kitt Peak || Spacewatch || — || align=right | 3.2 km || 
|-id=755 bgcolor=#d6d6d6
| 450755 ||  || — || May 12, 2007 || Mount Lemmon || Mount Lemmon Survey || — || align=right | 3.0 km || 
|-id=756 bgcolor=#d6d6d6
| 450756 ||  || — || May 13, 2007 || Mount Lemmon || Mount Lemmon Survey || — || align=right | 4.1 km || 
|-id=757 bgcolor=#d6d6d6
| 450757 ||  || — || May 9, 2007 || Catalina || CSS || — || align=right | 3.2 km || 
|-id=758 bgcolor=#fefefe
| 450758 ||  || — || June 9, 2007 || Kitt Peak || Spacewatch || Vcritical || align=right data-sort-value="0.51" | 510 m || 
|-id=759 bgcolor=#fefefe
| 450759 ||  || — || June 15, 2007 || Kitt Peak || Spacewatch || — || align=right data-sort-value="0.94" | 940 m || 
|-id=760 bgcolor=#fefefe
| 450760 ||  || — || August 5, 2007 || Altschwendt || W. Ries || — || align=right data-sort-value="0.94" | 940 m || 
|-id=761 bgcolor=#fefefe
| 450761 ||  || — || August 23, 2007 || Kitt Peak || Spacewatch || — || align=right data-sort-value="0.71" | 710 m || 
|-id=762 bgcolor=#fefefe
| 450762 ||  || — || August 23, 2007 || Kitt Peak || Spacewatch || — || align=right data-sort-value="0.65" | 650 m || 
|-id=763 bgcolor=#fefefe
| 450763 ||  || — || September 9, 2007 || Kitt Peak || Spacewatch || — || align=right data-sort-value="0.94" | 940 m || 
|-id=764 bgcolor=#fefefe
| 450764 ||  || — || September 11, 2007 || Kitt Peak || Spacewatch || NYS || align=right data-sort-value="0.95" | 950 m || 
|-id=765 bgcolor=#fefefe
| 450765 ||  || — || September 11, 2007 || Mount Lemmon || Mount Lemmon Survey || — || align=right data-sort-value="0.82" | 820 m || 
|-id=766 bgcolor=#d6d6d6
| 450766 ||  || — || September 11, 2007 || XuYi || PMO NEO || 3:2 || align=right | 4.0 km || 
|-id=767 bgcolor=#fefefe
| 450767 ||  || — || July 18, 2007 || Mount Lemmon || Mount Lemmon Survey || MAS || align=right data-sort-value="0.71" | 710 m || 
|-id=768 bgcolor=#fefefe
| 450768 ||  || — || September 11, 2007 || XuYi || PMO NEO || — || align=right data-sort-value="0.86" | 860 m || 
|-id=769 bgcolor=#fefefe
| 450769 ||  || — || September 11, 2007 || XuYi || PMO NEO || — || align=right data-sort-value="0.77" | 770 m || 
|-id=770 bgcolor=#fefefe
| 450770 ||  || — || September 12, 2007 || Mount Lemmon || Mount Lemmon Survey || — || align=right data-sort-value="0.47" | 470 m || 
|-id=771 bgcolor=#fefefe
| 450771 ||  || — || September 10, 2007 || Kitt Peak || Spacewatch || — || align=right data-sort-value="0.92" | 920 m || 
|-id=772 bgcolor=#fefefe
| 450772 ||  || — || August 24, 2007 || Kitt Peak || Spacewatch || MAScritical || align=right data-sort-value="0.57" | 570 m || 
|-id=773 bgcolor=#fefefe
| 450773 ||  || — || September 10, 2007 || Kitt Peak || Spacewatch || — || align=right data-sort-value="0.73" | 730 m || 
|-id=774 bgcolor=#fefefe
| 450774 ||  || — || August 24, 2007 || Kitt Peak || Spacewatch || — || align=right data-sort-value="0.70" | 700 m || 
|-id=775 bgcolor=#E9E9E9
| 450775 ||  || — || September 14, 2007 || Mount Lemmon || Mount Lemmon Survey || — || align=right data-sort-value="0.69" | 690 m || 
|-id=776 bgcolor=#d6d6d6
| 450776 ||  || — || August 10, 2007 || Kitt Peak || Spacewatch || Tj (2.96) || align=right | 4.6 km || 
|-id=777 bgcolor=#fefefe
| 450777 ||  || — || September 3, 2007 || Catalina || CSS || — || align=right data-sort-value="0.89" | 890 m || 
|-id=778 bgcolor=#fefefe
| 450778 ||  || — || September 19, 2007 || Socorro || LINEAR || critical || align=right data-sort-value="0.78" | 780 m || 
|-id=779 bgcolor=#FFC2E0
| 450779 ||  || — || September 20, 2007 || Siding Spring || SSS || AMO +1km || align=right data-sort-value="0.98" | 980 m || 
|-id=780 bgcolor=#E9E9E9
| 450780 ||  || — || September 18, 2007 || Mount Lemmon || Mount Lemmon Survey || — || align=right data-sort-value="0.71" | 710 m || 
|-id=781 bgcolor=#E9E9E9
| 450781 ||  || — || October 4, 2007 || Kitt Peak || Spacewatch || — || align=right data-sort-value="0.75" | 750 m || 
|-id=782 bgcolor=#fefefe
| 450782 ||  || — || October 12, 2007 || Socorro || LINEAR || H || align=right data-sort-value="0.59" | 590 m || 
|-id=783 bgcolor=#fefefe
| 450783 ||  || — || October 8, 2007 || Mount Lemmon || Mount Lemmon Survey || — || align=right data-sort-value="0.71" | 710 m || 
|-id=784 bgcolor=#E9E9E9
| 450784 ||  || — || October 6, 2007 || Kitt Peak || Spacewatch || (5) || align=right data-sort-value="0.68" | 680 m || 
|-id=785 bgcolor=#d6d6d6
| 450785 ||  || — || October 9, 2007 || Socorro || LINEAR || 3:2 || align=right | 4.8 km || 
|-id=786 bgcolor=#E9E9E9
| 450786 ||  || — || October 14, 2007 || Socorro || LINEAR || — || align=right data-sort-value="0.65" | 650 m || 
|-id=787 bgcolor=#E9E9E9
| 450787 ||  || — || October 7, 2007 || Mount Lemmon || Mount Lemmon Survey || — || align=right data-sort-value="0.88" | 880 m || 
|-id=788 bgcolor=#E9E9E9
| 450788 ||  || — || October 7, 2007 || Kitt Peak || Spacewatch || EUN || align=right | 1.3 km || 
|-id=789 bgcolor=#d6d6d6
| 450789 ||  || — || October 8, 2007 || Kitt Peak || Spacewatch || 3:2 || align=right | 3.2 km || 
|-id=790 bgcolor=#d6d6d6
| 450790 ||  || — || October 9, 2007 || Mount Lemmon || Mount Lemmon Survey || SHU3:2critical || align=right | 4.4 km || 
|-id=791 bgcolor=#d6d6d6
| 450791 ||  || — || October 10, 2007 || Mount Lemmon || Mount Lemmon Survey || SHU3:2critical || align=right | 3.5 km || 
|-id=792 bgcolor=#E9E9E9
| 450792 ||  || — || September 13, 2007 || Mount Lemmon || Mount Lemmon Survey || — || align=right data-sort-value="0.84" | 840 m || 
|-id=793 bgcolor=#E9E9E9
| 450793 ||  || — || October 9, 2007 || Kitt Peak || Spacewatch || — || align=right data-sort-value="0.52" | 520 m || 
|-id=794 bgcolor=#E9E9E9
| 450794 ||  || — || September 12, 2007 || Mount Lemmon || Mount Lemmon Survey || — || align=right data-sort-value="0.71" | 710 m || 
|-id=795 bgcolor=#d6d6d6
| 450795 ||  || — || October 12, 2007 || Kitt Peak || Spacewatch || 3:2 || align=right | 3.1 km || 
|-id=796 bgcolor=#d6d6d6
| 450796 ||  || — || October 12, 2007 || Kitt Peak || Spacewatch || 3:2 || align=right | 2.4 km || 
|-id=797 bgcolor=#E9E9E9
| 450797 ||  || — || October 12, 2007 || Kitt Peak || Spacewatch || — || align=right | 1.8 km || 
|-id=798 bgcolor=#E9E9E9
| 450798 ||  || — || September 12, 2007 || Mount Lemmon || Mount Lemmon Survey || (5) || align=right data-sort-value="0.74" | 740 m || 
|-id=799 bgcolor=#fefefe
| 450799 ||  || — || October 13, 2007 || Mount Lemmon || Mount Lemmon Survey || MAS || align=right data-sort-value="0.89" | 890 m || 
|-id=800 bgcolor=#E9E9E9
| 450800 ||  || — || October 10, 2007 || Mount Lemmon || Mount Lemmon Survey || — || align=right data-sort-value="0.54" | 540 m || 
|}

450801–450900 

|-bgcolor=#d6d6d6
| 450801 ||  || — || October 14, 2007 || Kitt Peak || Spacewatch || criticalTj (2.92) || align=right | 2.3 km || 
|-id=802 bgcolor=#E9E9E9
| 450802 ||  || — || October 10, 2007 || Kitt Peak || Spacewatch || — || align=right data-sort-value="0.93" | 930 m || 
|-id=803 bgcolor=#d6d6d6
| 450803 ||  || — || October 4, 2007 || Kitt Peak || Spacewatch || 3:2 || align=right | 3.7 km || 
|-id=804 bgcolor=#E9E9E9
| 450804 ||  || — || October 4, 2007 || Catalina || CSS || KON || align=right | 1.8 km || 
|-id=805 bgcolor=#d6d6d6
| 450805 ||  || — || October 9, 2007 || Catalina || CSS || 3:2 || align=right | 4.5 km || 
|-id=806 bgcolor=#d6d6d6
| 450806 ||  || — || October 9, 2007 || Catalina || CSS || 3:2 || align=right | 4.7 km || 
|-id=807 bgcolor=#d6d6d6
| 450807 ||  || — || October 17, 2007 || Anderson Mesa || LONEOS || Tj (2.89) || align=right | 5.3 km || 
|-id=808 bgcolor=#fefefe
| 450808 ||  || — || October 20, 2007 || Catalina || CSS || H || align=right data-sort-value="0.62" | 620 m || 
|-id=809 bgcolor=#E9E9E9
| 450809 ||  || — || October 16, 2007 || Mount Lemmon || Mount Lemmon Survey || — || align=right data-sort-value="0.98" | 980 m || 
|-id=810 bgcolor=#E9E9E9
| 450810 ||  || — || October 30, 2007 || Mount Lemmon || Mount Lemmon Survey || — || align=right data-sort-value="0.84" | 840 m || 
|-id=811 bgcolor=#E9E9E9
| 450811 ||  || — || October 15, 2007 || Mount Lemmon || Mount Lemmon Survey || — || align=right data-sort-value="0.82" | 820 m || 
|-id=812 bgcolor=#E9E9E9
| 450812 ||  || — || October 30, 2007 || Kitt Peak || Spacewatch || — || align=right data-sort-value="0.75" | 750 m || 
|-id=813 bgcolor=#E9E9E9
| 450813 ||  || — || October 30, 2007 || Kitt Peak || Spacewatch || — || align=right data-sort-value="0.90" | 900 m || 
|-id=814 bgcolor=#fefefe
| 450814 ||  || — || February 14, 2005 || Kitt Peak || Spacewatch || NYS || align=right data-sort-value="0.63" | 630 m || 
|-id=815 bgcolor=#d6d6d6
| 450815 ||  || — || November 2, 2007 || Dauban || Chante-Perdrix Obs. || 3:2 || align=right | 4.1 km || 
|-id=816 bgcolor=#E9E9E9
| 450816 ||  || — || November 1, 2007 || Mount Lemmon || Mount Lemmon Survey || — || align=right | 1.1 km || 
|-id=817 bgcolor=#E9E9E9
| 450817 ||  || — || November 2, 2007 || Mount Lemmon || Mount Lemmon Survey || (5) || align=right data-sort-value="0.67" | 670 m || 
|-id=818 bgcolor=#E9E9E9
| 450818 ||  || — || November 3, 2007 || Kitt Peak || Spacewatch || — || align=right data-sort-value="0.98" | 980 m || 
|-id=819 bgcolor=#E9E9E9
| 450819 ||  || — || November 1, 2007 || Kitt Peak || Spacewatch || — || align=right data-sort-value="0.96" | 960 m || 
|-id=820 bgcolor=#E9E9E9
| 450820 ||  || — || November 1, 2007 || Kitt Peak || Spacewatch || — || align=right | 1.0 km || 
|-id=821 bgcolor=#E9E9E9
| 450821 ||  || — || October 20, 2007 || Mount Lemmon || Mount Lemmon Survey || (5) || align=right data-sort-value="0.70" | 700 m || 
|-id=822 bgcolor=#E9E9E9
| 450822 ||  || — || November 1, 2007 || Kitt Peak || Spacewatch || — || align=right | 1.3 km || 
|-id=823 bgcolor=#E9E9E9
| 450823 ||  || — || November 2, 2007 || Socorro || LINEAR || — || align=right data-sort-value="0.65" | 650 m || 
|-id=824 bgcolor=#fefefe
| 450824 ||  || — || November 4, 2007 || Socorro || LINEAR || — || align=right data-sort-value="0.86" | 860 m || 
|-id=825 bgcolor=#E9E9E9
| 450825 ||  || — || November 3, 2007 || Socorro || LINEAR || — || align=right data-sort-value="0.82" | 820 m || 
|-id=826 bgcolor=#d6d6d6
| 450826 ||  || — || November 8, 2007 || Socorro || LINEAR || Tj (2.95) || align=right | 4.1 km || 
|-id=827 bgcolor=#E9E9E9
| 450827 ||  || — || November 3, 2007 || Kitt Peak || Spacewatch || (5) || align=right data-sort-value="0.85" | 850 m || 
|-id=828 bgcolor=#fefefe
| 450828 ||  || — || October 18, 2007 || Kitt Peak || Spacewatch || — || align=right data-sort-value="0.95" | 950 m || 
|-id=829 bgcolor=#E9E9E9
| 450829 ||  || — || November 4, 2007 || Kitt Peak || Spacewatch || EUN || align=right | 1.1 km || 
|-id=830 bgcolor=#E9E9E9
| 450830 ||  || — || November 5, 2007 || Kitt Peak || Spacewatch || — || align=right data-sort-value="0.94" | 940 m || 
|-id=831 bgcolor=#E9E9E9
| 450831 ||  || — || November 5, 2007 || Kitt Peak || Spacewatch || — || align=right data-sort-value="0.97" | 970 m || 
|-id=832 bgcolor=#E9E9E9
| 450832 ||  || — || November 5, 2007 || Kitt Peak || Spacewatch || — || align=right data-sort-value="0.80" | 800 m || 
|-id=833 bgcolor=#E9E9E9
| 450833 ||  || — || November 4, 2007 || Mount Lemmon || Mount Lemmon Survey || — || align=right | 1.2 km || 
|-id=834 bgcolor=#E9E9E9
| 450834 ||  || — || November 4, 2007 || Mount Lemmon || Mount Lemmon Survey || — || align=right | 3.3 km || 
|-id=835 bgcolor=#E9E9E9
| 450835 ||  || — || November 8, 2007 || Mount Lemmon || Mount Lemmon Survey || — || align=right | 1.3 km || 
|-id=836 bgcolor=#E9E9E9
| 450836 ||  || — || November 8, 2007 || Mount Lemmon || Mount Lemmon Survey || — || align=right | 1.8 km || 
|-id=837 bgcolor=#d6d6d6
| 450837 ||  || — || September 14, 2007 || Mount Lemmon || Mount Lemmon Survey || Tj (2.96) || align=right | 3.7 km || 
|-id=838 bgcolor=#E9E9E9
| 450838 ||  || — || November 1, 2007 || Kitt Peak || Spacewatch || — || align=right data-sort-value="0.96" | 960 m || 
|-id=839 bgcolor=#d6d6d6
| 450839 ||  || — || November 2, 2007 || Mount Lemmon || Mount Lemmon Survey || (6124)3:2 || align=right | 3.5 km || 
|-id=840 bgcolor=#E9E9E9
| 450840 ||  || — || November 14, 2007 || Mount Lemmon || Mount Lemmon Survey || — || align=right data-sort-value="0.82" | 820 m || 
|-id=841 bgcolor=#d6d6d6
| 450841 ||  || — || November 13, 2007 || Kitt Peak || Spacewatch || 3:2 || align=right | 4.8 km || 
|-id=842 bgcolor=#E9E9E9
| 450842 ||  || — || October 10, 2007 || Mount Lemmon || Mount Lemmon Survey || — || align=right data-sort-value="0.92" | 920 m || 
|-id=843 bgcolor=#fefefe
| 450843 ||  || — || November 2, 2007 || Mount Lemmon || Mount Lemmon Survey || H || align=right data-sort-value="0.68" | 680 m || 
|-id=844 bgcolor=#E9E9E9
| 450844 ||  || — || November 12, 2007 || Mount Lemmon || Mount Lemmon Survey || — || align=right data-sort-value="0.94" | 940 m || 
|-id=845 bgcolor=#fefefe
| 450845 ||  || — || November 14, 2007 || Kitt Peak || Spacewatch || H || align=right data-sort-value="0.86" | 860 m || 
|-id=846 bgcolor=#E9E9E9
| 450846 ||  || — || November 4, 2007 || Kitt Peak || Spacewatch || — || align=right | 1.4 km || 
|-id=847 bgcolor=#E9E9E9
| 450847 ||  || — || November 6, 2007 || Kitt Peak || Spacewatch || — || align=right data-sort-value="0.87" | 870 m || 
|-id=848 bgcolor=#E9E9E9
| 450848 ||  || — || November 3, 2007 || Kitt Peak || Spacewatch || — || align=right data-sort-value="0.94" | 940 m || 
|-id=849 bgcolor=#E9E9E9
| 450849 ||  || — || November 18, 2007 || Mount Lemmon || Mount Lemmon Survey || — || align=right data-sort-value="0.82" | 820 m || 
|-id=850 bgcolor=#E9E9E9
| 450850 ||  || — || November 19, 2007 || Mount Lemmon || Mount Lemmon Survey || — || align=right | 1.2 km || 
|-id=851 bgcolor=#E9E9E9
| 450851 ||  || — || November 24, 2003 || Kitt Peak || Spacewatch || — || align=right data-sort-value="0.85" | 850 m || 
|-id=852 bgcolor=#E9E9E9
| 450852 ||  || — || November 18, 2007 || Mount Lemmon || Mount Lemmon Survey || — || align=right data-sort-value="0.78" | 780 m || 
|-id=853 bgcolor=#E9E9E9
| 450853 ||  || — || October 24, 2007 || Mount Lemmon || Mount Lemmon Survey || — || align=right | 1.2 km || 
|-id=854 bgcolor=#E9E9E9
| 450854 ||  || — || November 20, 2007 || Mount Lemmon || Mount Lemmon Survey || — || align=right | 1.5 km || 
|-id=855 bgcolor=#E9E9E9
| 450855 ||  || — || November 19, 2007 || Kitt Peak || Spacewatch || — || align=right data-sort-value="0.74" | 740 m || 
|-id=856 bgcolor=#E9E9E9
| 450856 ||  || — || December 5, 2007 || Mount Lemmon || Mount Lemmon Survey || — || align=right | 1.1 km || 
|-id=857 bgcolor=#E9E9E9
| 450857 ||  || — || December 6, 2007 || Mount Lemmon || Mount Lemmon Survey || — || align=right | 2.3 km || 
|-id=858 bgcolor=#E9E9E9
| 450858 ||  || — || December 12, 2007 || Great Shefford || P. Birtwhistle || (5) || align=right data-sort-value="0.65" | 650 m || 
|-id=859 bgcolor=#fefefe
| 450859 ||  || — || November 7, 2007 || Kitt Peak || Spacewatch || H || align=right data-sort-value="0.87" | 870 m || 
|-id=860 bgcolor=#E9E9E9
| 450860 ||  || — || November 8, 2007 || Kitt Peak || Spacewatch || — || align=right data-sort-value="0.86" | 860 m || 
|-id=861 bgcolor=#E9E9E9
| 450861 ||  || — || December 10, 2007 || Socorro || LINEAR || RAF || align=right data-sort-value="0.99" | 990 m || 
|-id=862 bgcolor=#E9E9E9
| 450862 ||  || — || December 15, 2007 || Kitt Peak || Spacewatch || — || align=right data-sort-value="0.88" | 880 m || 
|-id=863 bgcolor=#E9E9E9
| 450863 ||  || — || December 13, 2007 || Tiki || N. Teamo || — || align=right | 1.2 km || 
|-id=864 bgcolor=#E9E9E9
| 450864 ||  || — || December 5, 2007 || Kitt Peak || Spacewatch || ADE || align=right | 1.9 km || 
|-id=865 bgcolor=#E9E9E9
| 450865 ||  || — || December 5, 2007 || Mount Lemmon || Mount Lemmon Survey || — || align=right | 1.3 km || 
|-id=866 bgcolor=#E9E9E9
| 450866 ||  || — || December 3, 2007 || Kitt Peak || Spacewatch || — || align=right | 1.0 km || 
|-id=867 bgcolor=#E9E9E9
| 450867 ||  || — || December 16, 2007 || Kitt Peak || Spacewatch || (5) || align=right data-sort-value="0.80" | 800 m || 
|-id=868 bgcolor=#E9E9E9
| 450868 ||  || — || December 18, 2007 || Mount Lemmon || Mount Lemmon Survey || (5) || align=right data-sort-value="0.96" | 960 m || 
|-id=869 bgcolor=#E9E9E9
| 450869 ||  || — || December 18, 2007 || Kitt Peak || Spacewatch || — || align=right | 1.5 km || 
|-id=870 bgcolor=#E9E9E9
| 450870 ||  || — || November 4, 2007 || Mount Lemmon || Mount Lemmon Survey || WIT || align=right data-sort-value="0.98" | 980 m || 
|-id=871 bgcolor=#E9E9E9
| 450871 ||  || — || December 28, 2007 || Kitt Peak || Spacewatch || — || align=right data-sort-value="0.75" | 750 m || 
|-id=872 bgcolor=#E9E9E9
| 450872 ||  || — || December 30, 2007 || Kitt Peak || Spacewatch || — || align=right | 2.2 km || 
|-id=873 bgcolor=#E9E9E9
| 450873 ||  || — || December 28, 2007 || Kitt Peak || Spacewatch || — || align=right | 1.4 km || 
|-id=874 bgcolor=#E9E9E9
| 450874 ||  || — || December 31, 2007 || Catalina || CSS || — || align=right data-sort-value="0.93" | 930 m || 
|-id=875 bgcolor=#E9E9E9
| 450875 ||  || — || January 10, 2008 || Mount Lemmon || Mount Lemmon Survey || — || align=right | 1.1 km || 
|-id=876 bgcolor=#E9E9E9
| 450876 ||  || — || December 30, 2007 || Mount Lemmon || Mount Lemmon Survey || — || align=right | 1.2 km || 
|-id=877 bgcolor=#E9E9E9
| 450877 ||  || — || January 10, 2008 || Mount Lemmon || Mount Lemmon Survey || — || align=right | 1.8 km || 
|-id=878 bgcolor=#E9E9E9
| 450878 ||  || — || January 10, 2008 || Mount Lemmon || Mount Lemmon Survey || — || align=right | 2.6 km || 
|-id=879 bgcolor=#E9E9E9
| 450879 ||  || — || December 31, 2007 || Mount Lemmon || Mount Lemmon Survey || — || align=right | 1.7 km || 
|-id=880 bgcolor=#E9E9E9
| 450880 ||  || — || January 10, 2008 || Mount Lemmon || Mount Lemmon Survey || — || align=right | 1.5 km || 
|-id=881 bgcolor=#E9E9E9
| 450881 ||  || — || November 18, 2007 || Mount Lemmon || Mount Lemmon Survey || EUN || align=right data-sort-value="0.98" | 980 m || 
|-id=882 bgcolor=#E9E9E9
| 450882 ||  || — || December 30, 2007 || Kitt Peak || Spacewatch || — || align=right | 1.9 km || 
|-id=883 bgcolor=#E9E9E9
| 450883 ||  || — || December 30, 2007 || Kitt Peak || Spacewatch || — || align=right | 1.3 km || 
|-id=884 bgcolor=#FA8072
| 450884 ||  || — || January 15, 2008 || Socorro || LINEAR || — || align=right data-sort-value="0.84" | 840 m || 
|-id=885 bgcolor=#E9E9E9
| 450885 ||  || — || January 13, 2008 || Mount Lemmon || Mount Lemmon Survey || — || align=right | 1.8 km || 
|-id=886 bgcolor=#E9E9E9
| 450886 ||  || — || January 14, 2008 || Kitt Peak || Spacewatch || — || align=right | 1.5 km || 
|-id=887 bgcolor=#E9E9E9
| 450887 ||  || — || January 1, 2008 || Kitt Peak || Spacewatch || — || align=right | 1.4 km || 
|-id=888 bgcolor=#E9E9E9
| 450888 ||  || — || January 14, 2008 || Kitt Peak || Spacewatch || — || align=right | 2.0 km || 
|-id=889 bgcolor=#E9E9E9
| 450889 ||  || — || January 14, 2008 || Kitt Peak || Spacewatch || (5) || align=right data-sort-value="0.77" | 770 m || 
|-id=890 bgcolor=#E9E9E9
| 450890 ||  || — || January 15, 2008 || Kitt Peak || Spacewatch || BRG || align=right | 1.1 km || 
|-id=891 bgcolor=#E9E9E9
| 450891 ||  || — || January 15, 2008 || Kitt Peak || Spacewatch || (5) || align=right data-sort-value="0.77" | 770 m || 
|-id=892 bgcolor=#E9E9E9
| 450892 ||  || — || January 18, 2008 || Kitt Peak || Spacewatch || MAR || align=right | 1.2 km || 
|-id=893 bgcolor=#E9E9E9
| 450893 ||  || — || December 30, 2007 || Kitt Peak || Spacewatch || — || align=right | 2.0 km || 
|-id=894 bgcolor=#FFC2E0
| 450894 ||  || — || January 31, 2008 || Socorro || LINEAR || APO +1kmPHAmoon || align=right data-sort-value="0.84" | 840 m || 
|-id=895 bgcolor=#E9E9E9
| 450895 ||  || — || January 30, 2008 || Mount Lemmon || Mount Lemmon Survey || (5) || align=right data-sort-value="0.85" | 850 m || 
|-id=896 bgcolor=#E9E9E9
| 450896 ||  || — || January 1, 2008 || Kitt Peak || Spacewatch || — || align=right | 1.7 km || 
|-id=897 bgcolor=#E9E9E9
| 450897 ||  || — || January 30, 2008 || Mount Lemmon || Mount Lemmon Survey || GEF || align=right | 1.1 km || 
|-id=898 bgcolor=#E9E9E9
| 450898 ||  || — || January 18, 2008 || Catalina || CSS || — || align=right | 1.8 km || 
|-id=899 bgcolor=#E9E9E9
| 450899 ||  || — || January 19, 2008 || Mount Lemmon || Mount Lemmon Survey || — || align=right | 1.7 km || 
|-id=900 bgcolor=#E9E9E9
| 450900 ||  || — || February 3, 2008 || Kitt Peak || Spacewatch || — || align=right | 1.9 km || 
|}

450901–451000 

|-bgcolor=#E9E9E9
| 450901 ||  || — || February 3, 2008 || Catalina || CSS || — || align=right | 1.2 km || 
|-id=902 bgcolor=#E9E9E9
| 450902 ||  || — || February 7, 2008 || Kitt Peak || Spacewatch || — || align=right | 1.5 km || 
|-id=903 bgcolor=#E9E9E9
| 450903 ||  || — || February 6, 2008 || Catalina || CSS || — || align=right | 1.4 km || 
|-id=904 bgcolor=#E9E9E9
| 450904 ||  || — || September 15, 2007 || Mount Lemmon || Mount Lemmon Survey || — || align=right data-sort-value="0.94" | 940 m || 
|-id=905 bgcolor=#E9E9E9
| 450905 ||  || — || February 3, 2008 || Catalina || CSS || RAF || align=right | 1.0 km || 
|-id=906 bgcolor=#E9E9E9
| 450906 ||  || — || February 7, 2008 || Mount Lemmon || Mount Lemmon Survey || AGN || align=right data-sort-value="0.94" | 940 m || 
|-id=907 bgcolor=#E9E9E9
| 450907 ||  || — || February 8, 2008 || Kitt Peak || Spacewatch || — || align=right | 1.8 km || 
|-id=908 bgcolor=#E9E9E9
| 450908 ||  || — || February 9, 2008 || Kitt Peak || Spacewatch || — || align=right | 2.1 km || 
|-id=909 bgcolor=#E9E9E9
| 450909 ||  || — || February 9, 2008 || Kitt Peak || Spacewatch || — || align=right | 1.3 km || 
|-id=910 bgcolor=#E9E9E9
| 450910 ||  || — || September 25, 2007 || Mount Lemmon || Mount Lemmon Survey || — || align=right | 1.3 km || 
|-id=911 bgcolor=#E9E9E9
| 450911 ||  || — || January 1, 2008 || Catalina || CSS || — || align=right | 1.7 km || 
|-id=912 bgcolor=#E9E9E9
| 450912 ||  || — || February 9, 2008 || Kitt Peak || Spacewatch || — || align=right | 2.0 km || 
|-id=913 bgcolor=#E9E9E9
| 450913 ||  || — || February 12, 2008 || Kitt Peak || Spacewatch || HOF || align=right | 2.4 km || 
|-id=914 bgcolor=#E9E9E9
| 450914 ||  || — || February 12, 2008 || Kitt Peak || Spacewatch || — || align=right | 1.9 km || 
|-id=915 bgcolor=#E9E9E9
| 450915 ||  || — || January 10, 2008 || Kitt Peak || Spacewatch || — || align=right | 1.1 km || 
|-id=916 bgcolor=#E9E9E9
| 450916 ||  || — || February 2, 2008 || Kitt Peak || Spacewatch || — || align=right | 1.3 km || 
|-id=917 bgcolor=#E9E9E9
| 450917 ||  || — || February 10, 2008 || Mount Lemmon || Mount Lemmon Survey || — || align=right | 1.3 km || 
|-id=918 bgcolor=#E9E9E9
| 450918 ||  || — || December 30, 2007 || Mount Lemmon || Mount Lemmon Survey || — || align=right | 1.4 km || 
|-id=919 bgcolor=#E9E9E9
| 450919 ||  || — || December 31, 2007 || Mount Lemmon || Mount Lemmon Survey || JUN || align=right | 1.1 km || 
|-id=920 bgcolor=#E9E9E9
| 450920 ||  || — || December 19, 2007 || Mount Lemmon || Mount Lemmon Survey || — || align=right | 1.7 km || 
|-id=921 bgcolor=#d6d6d6
| 450921 ||  || — || February 28, 2008 || Kitt Peak || Spacewatch || — || align=right | 2.7 km || 
|-id=922 bgcolor=#E9E9E9
| 450922 ||  || — || March 2, 2008 || Vail-Jarnac || Jarnac Obs. || — || align=right | 2.4 km || 
|-id=923 bgcolor=#E9E9E9
| 450923 ||  || — || February 13, 2008 || Catalina || CSS || — || align=right | 1.2 km || 
|-id=924 bgcolor=#E9E9E9
| 450924 ||  || — || February 28, 2008 || Catalina || CSS || ADE || align=right | 2.0 km || 
|-id=925 bgcolor=#E9E9E9
| 450925 ||  || — || January 12, 2008 || Catalina || CSS || — || align=right | 1.9 km || 
|-id=926 bgcolor=#E9E9E9
| 450926 ||  || — || March 5, 2008 || Mount Lemmon || Mount Lemmon Survey || — || align=right | 2.6 km || 
|-id=927 bgcolor=#d6d6d6
| 450927 ||  || — || March 5, 2008 || Mount Lemmon || Mount Lemmon Survey || — || align=right | 2.0 km || 
|-id=928 bgcolor=#E9E9E9
| 450928 ||  || — || March 7, 2008 || Kitt Peak || Spacewatch || MRX || align=right | 1.1 km || 
|-id=929 bgcolor=#E9E9E9
| 450929 ||  || — || February 14, 2008 || Catalina || CSS || JUN || align=right | 1.0 km || 
|-id=930 bgcolor=#fefefe
| 450930 ||  || — || March 2, 2008 || Kitt Peak || Spacewatch || H || align=right data-sort-value="0.54" | 540 m || 
|-id=931 bgcolor=#E9E9E9
| 450931 Coculescu ||  ||  || March 11, 2008 || La Silla || EURONEAR || — || align=right | 2.1 km || 
|-id=932 bgcolor=#E9E9E9
| 450932 ||  || — || March 2, 2008 || Kitt Peak || Spacewatch || — || align=right | 1.8 km || 
|-id=933 bgcolor=#E9E9E9
| 450933 ||  || — || March 26, 2008 || Kitt Peak || Spacewatch || — || align=right | 1.5 km || 
|-id=934 bgcolor=#E9E9E9
| 450934 ||  || — || January 19, 2008 || Mount Lemmon || Mount Lemmon Survey || — || align=right | 2.1 km || 
|-id=935 bgcolor=#fefefe
| 450935 ||  || — || March 27, 2008 || Kitt Peak || Spacewatch || — || align=right data-sort-value="0.87" | 870 m || 
|-id=936 bgcolor=#d6d6d6
| 450936 ||  || — || March 27, 2008 || Kitt Peak || Spacewatch || — || align=right | 2.6 km || 
|-id=937 bgcolor=#E9E9E9
| 450937 ||  || — || March 28, 2008 || Mount Lemmon || Mount Lemmon Survey || JUN || align=right data-sort-value="0.74" | 740 m || 
|-id=938 bgcolor=#E9E9E9
| 450938 ||  || — || February 13, 2008 || Mount Lemmon || Mount Lemmon Survey || — || align=right | 2.3 km || 
|-id=939 bgcolor=#d6d6d6
| 450939 ||  || — || March 27, 2008 || Mount Lemmon || Mount Lemmon Survey || — || align=right | 3.2 km || 
|-id=940 bgcolor=#E9E9E9
| 450940 ||  || — || March 28, 2008 || Mount Lemmon || Mount Lemmon Survey || — || align=right | 2.1 km || 
|-id=941 bgcolor=#d6d6d6
| 450941 ||  || — || March 29, 2008 || Mount Lemmon || Mount Lemmon Survey || — || align=right | 3.4 km || 
|-id=942 bgcolor=#E9E9E9
| 450942 ||  || — || March 31, 2008 || Mount Lemmon || Mount Lemmon Survey || HOF || align=right | 2.2 km || 
|-id=943 bgcolor=#d6d6d6
| 450943 ||  || — || March 31, 2008 || Mount Lemmon || Mount Lemmon Survey || — || align=right | 3.2 km || 
|-id=944 bgcolor=#d6d6d6
| 450944 ||  || — || March 5, 2008 || Mount Lemmon || Mount Lemmon Survey || EOS || align=right | 2.0 km || 
|-id=945 bgcolor=#E9E9E9
| 450945 ||  || — || March 28, 2008 || Kitt Peak || Spacewatch || AGN || align=right | 1.1 km || 
|-id=946 bgcolor=#E9E9E9
| 450946 ||  || — || March 31, 2008 || Mount Lemmon || Mount Lemmon Survey || — || align=right | 1.8 km || 
|-id=947 bgcolor=#d6d6d6
| 450947 ||  || — || April 3, 2008 || Kitt Peak || Spacewatch || — || align=right | 2.8 km || 
|-id=948 bgcolor=#d6d6d6
| 450948 ||  || — || April 14, 2008 || Mount Lemmon || Mount Lemmon Survey || — || align=right | 2.8 km || 
|-id=949 bgcolor=#d6d6d6
| 450949 ||  || — || April 15, 2008 || Mount Lemmon || Mount Lemmon Survey || — || align=right | 2.6 km || 
|-id=950 bgcolor=#E9E9E9
| 450950 ||  || — || April 7, 2008 || Kitt Peak || Spacewatch || DOR || align=right | 2.4 km || 
|-id=951 bgcolor=#E9E9E9
| 450951 ||  || — || April 3, 2008 || Mount Lemmon || Mount Lemmon Survey || — || align=right | 1.7 km || 
|-id=952 bgcolor=#E9E9E9
| 450952 ||  || — || April 26, 2008 || Mount Lemmon || Mount Lemmon Survey || — || align=right | 2.0 km || 
|-id=953 bgcolor=#E9E9E9
| 450953 ||  || — || April 4, 2008 || Catalina || CSS || — || align=right | 2.6 km || 
|-id=954 bgcolor=#d6d6d6
| 450954 ||  || — || April 14, 2008 || Kitt Peak || Spacewatch || — || align=right | 2.9 km || 
|-id=955 bgcolor=#d6d6d6
| 450955 ||  || — || April 6, 2008 || Mount Lemmon || Mount Lemmon Survey || EOS || align=right | 1.7 km || 
|-id=956 bgcolor=#d6d6d6
| 450956 ||  || — || May 8, 2008 || Kitt Peak || Spacewatch || — || align=right | 3.9 km || 
|-id=957 bgcolor=#E9E9E9
| 450957 ||  || — || May 11, 2008 || Kitt Peak || Spacewatch || — || align=right | 2.0 km || 
|-id=958 bgcolor=#d6d6d6
| 450958 ||  || — || April 4, 2008 || Kitt Peak || Spacewatch || — || align=right | 2.0 km || 
|-id=959 bgcolor=#d6d6d6
| 450959 ||  || — || May 26, 2008 || Kitt Peak || Spacewatch || — || align=right | 2.7 km || 
|-id=960 bgcolor=#d6d6d6
| 450960 ||  || — || May 3, 2008 || Mount Lemmon || Mount Lemmon Survey || — || align=right | 3.2 km || 
|-id=961 bgcolor=#d6d6d6
| 450961 ||  || — || May 13, 2008 || Mount Lemmon || Mount Lemmon Survey || — || align=right | 2.8 km || 
|-id=962 bgcolor=#d6d6d6
| 450962 ||  || — || May 28, 2008 || Kitt Peak || Spacewatch || — || align=right | 3.7 km || 
|-id=963 bgcolor=#d6d6d6
| 450963 ||  || — || May 31, 2008 || Mount Lemmon || Mount Lemmon Survey || — || align=right | 3.5 km || 
|-id=964 bgcolor=#d6d6d6
| 450964 ||  || — || May 30, 2008 || Kitt Peak || Spacewatch || — || align=right | 2.7 km || 
|-id=965 bgcolor=#fefefe
| 450965 ||  || — || July 13, 2008 || Eskridge || G. Hug || — || align=right data-sort-value="0.56" | 560 m || 
|-id=966 bgcolor=#fefefe
| 450966 ||  || — || July 26, 2008 || Siding Spring || SSS || — || align=right data-sort-value="0.63" | 630 m || 
|-id=967 bgcolor=#fefefe
| 450967 ||  || — || August 6, 2008 || La Sagra || OAM Obs. || critical || align=right data-sort-value="0.59" | 590 m || 
|-id=968 bgcolor=#fefefe
| 450968 ||  || — || August 30, 2008 || Socorro || LINEAR || — || align=right data-sort-value="0.81" | 810 m || 
|-id=969 bgcolor=#fefefe
| 450969 ||  || — || August 24, 2008 || Kitt Peak || Spacewatch || V || align=right data-sort-value="0.59" | 590 m || 
|-id=970 bgcolor=#fefefe
| 450970 ||  || — || August 26, 2008 || Socorro || LINEAR || — || align=right data-sort-value="0.64" | 640 m || 
|-id=971 bgcolor=#fefefe
| 450971 ||  || — || September 2, 2008 || Kitt Peak || Spacewatch || — || align=right data-sort-value="0.59" | 590 m || 
|-id=972 bgcolor=#fefefe
| 450972 ||  || — || September 6, 2008 || Mount Lemmon || Mount Lemmon Survey || — || align=right data-sort-value="0.54" | 540 m || 
|-id=973 bgcolor=#fefefe
| 450973 ||  || — || September 6, 2008 || Mount Lemmon || Mount Lemmon Survey || — || align=right data-sort-value="0.68" | 680 m || 
|-id=974 bgcolor=#fefefe
| 450974 ||  || — || September 3, 2008 || Kitt Peak || Spacewatch || V || align=right data-sort-value="0.71" | 710 m || 
|-id=975 bgcolor=#fefefe
| 450975 ||  || — || September 7, 2008 || Mount Lemmon || Mount Lemmon Survey || — || align=right data-sort-value="0.70" | 700 m || 
|-id=976 bgcolor=#fefefe
| 450976 ||  || — || September 22, 2008 || Socorro || LINEAR || — || align=right data-sort-value="0.85" | 850 m || 
|-id=977 bgcolor=#fefefe
| 450977 ||  || — || September 23, 2008 || Goodricke-Pigott || R. A. Tucker || — || align=right data-sort-value="0.99" | 990 m || 
|-id=978 bgcolor=#fefefe
| 450978 ||  || — || September 22, 2008 || Socorro || LINEAR || — || align=right data-sort-value="0.76" | 760 m || 
|-id=979 bgcolor=#FA8072
| 450979 ||  || — || September 19, 2008 || Kitt Peak || Spacewatch || — || align=right data-sort-value="0.78" | 780 m || 
|-id=980 bgcolor=#fefefe
| 450980 ||  || — || February 25, 2007 || Mount Lemmon || Mount Lemmon Survey || — || align=right data-sort-value="0.98" | 980 m || 
|-id=981 bgcolor=#fefefe
| 450981 ||  || — || September 27, 2008 || Taunus || S. Karge, E. Schwab || — || align=right data-sort-value="0.67" | 670 m || 
|-id=982 bgcolor=#fefefe
| 450982 ||  || — || September 21, 2008 || Kitt Peak || Spacewatch || — || align=right data-sort-value="0.70" | 700 m || 
|-id=983 bgcolor=#fefefe
| 450983 ||  || — || September 22, 2008 || Mount Lemmon || Mount Lemmon Survey || — || align=right data-sort-value="0.65" | 650 m || 
|-id=984 bgcolor=#fefefe
| 450984 ||  || — || September 25, 2008 || Kitt Peak || Spacewatch || — || align=right data-sort-value="0.61" | 610 m || 
|-id=985 bgcolor=#fefefe
| 450985 ||  || — || November 25, 2005 || Mount Lemmon || Mount Lemmon Survey || — || align=right data-sort-value="0.56" | 560 m || 
|-id=986 bgcolor=#fefefe
| 450986 ||  || — || September 27, 2008 || Mount Lemmon || Mount Lemmon Survey || — || align=right data-sort-value="0.74" | 740 m || 
|-id=987 bgcolor=#fefefe
| 450987 ||  || — || September 20, 2008 || Catalina || CSS || — || align=right data-sort-value="0.78" | 780 m || 
|-id=988 bgcolor=#fefefe
| 450988 ||  || — || September 24, 2008 || Kitt Peak || Spacewatch || — || align=right data-sort-value="0.61" | 610 m || 
|-id=989 bgcolor=#fefefe
| 450989 ||  || — || September 21, 2008 || Kitt Peak || Spacewatch || — || align=right data-sort-value="0.63" | 630 m || 
|-id=990 bgcolor=#fefefe
| 450990 ||  || — || September 29, 2008 || Mount Lemmon || Mount Lemmon Survey || — || align=right data-sort-value="0.79" | 790 m || 
|-id=991 bgcolor=#fefefe
| 450991 ||  || — || October 3, 2008 || Tiki || N. Teamo || — || align=right data-sort-value="0.79" | 790 m || 
|-id=992 bgcolor=#fefefe
| 450992 ||  || — || October 1, 2008 || Mount Lemmon || Mount Lemmon Survey || — || align=right | 1.2 km || 
|-id=993 bgcolor=#fefefe
| 450993 ||  || — || October 2, 2008 || Kitt Peak || Spacewatch || — || align=right data-sort-value="0.86" | 860 m || 
|-id=994 bgcolor=#fefefe
| 450994 ||  || — || October 2, 2008 || Kitt Peak || Spacewatch || V || align=right data-sort-value="0.49" | 490 m || 
|-id=995 bgcolor=#fefefe
| 450995 ||  || — || September 20, 2008 || Kitt Peak || Spacewatch || — || align=right data-sort-value="0.70" | 700 m || 
|-id=996 bgcolor=#fefefe
| 450996 ||  || — || September 24, 2008 || Kitt Peak || Spacewatch || — || align=right data-sort-value="0.67" | 670 m || 
|-id=997 bgcolor=#fefefe
| 450997 ||  || — || October 3, 2008 || Kitt Peak || Spacewatch || — || align=right data-sort-value="0.52" | 520 m || 
|-id=998 bgcolor=#fefefe
| 450998 ||  || — || October 4, 2008 || La Sagra || OAM Obs. || — || align=right data-sort-value="0.85" | 850 m || 
|-id=999 bgcolor=#fefefe
| 450999 ||  || — || October 6, 2008 || Kitt Peak || Spacewatch || critical || align=right data-sort-value="0.41" | 410 m || 
|-id=000 bgcolor=#fefefe
| 451000 ||  || — || December 26, 2005 || Mount Lemmon || Mount Lemmon Survey || — || align=right data-sort-value="0.68" | 680 m || 
|}

References

External links 
 Discovery Circumstances: Numbered Minor Planets (450001)–(455000) (IAU Minor Planet Center)

0450